This is a list of foreign players that have played in the Cypriot First Division. The following players:
have played at least one Cypriot First Division game for the respective club. 
have been born in Cyprus and were capped by a foreign national team. This includes players who have dual citizenship with Cyprus.
The players written with bold text have at least one cap for their national team.

Afghanistan 
Farshad Noor – Nea Salamina (2018–2020)
Djelaludin Sharityar – APEP FC (2009–2010), Ethnikos Achna FC (2010–2011)

Albania 
Arjan Beqaj – Anorthosis Famagusta FC (2006–2010), Olympiakos Nicosia (2010), Ermis Aradippou (2011)
Klodian Duro – AC Omonia (2008–2009), Apollon Limassol (2009–2010) 
Ervin Fakaj – Enosis Neon Paralimni FC (2000–2001)
Altin Haxhi – Anorthosis Famagusta FC (2005–2006), APOEL FC (2007–2010) 
Isli Hidi – Alki Larnaca FC (2008), Olympiakos Nicosia (2011), AEL Limassol (2011–2013), Apollon Limassol (2013–2016), Olympiakos Nicosia (2017–2018) 
Salvador Kaçaj – AC Omonia (1994–1997) 
Sokol Kushta – Olympiakos Nicosia (1994–1995), Ethnikos Achna FC (1995–1996)
Qazim Laçi – APOEL FC (2016) 
Geri Malaj – Doxa Katokopias FC (2010)
Elvir Maloku – AEK Larnaca FC (2017–2018)
Viktor Paço – AEK Larnaca FC (1993–1995)
Erind Prifti – AEP Paphos FC (2013) 
Blerim Rrustemi – Alki Larnaca FC (2008) 
Arjan Sheta – Ayia Napa FC (2006–2007)
Vasil Shkurti – Aris Limassol FC (2016–2017)
Aldo Teqja – Anorthosis Famagusta FC (2013–2014, 2015–2016) 
Rudi Vata – Apollon Limassol (1996–1998) 
Arjan Xhumba – Enosis Neon Paralimni FC (1998–2000) 
Roland Zajmi – Apollon Limassol (2004–2005)

Algeria 
El Hedi Belameiri – Alki Oroklini (2018–2019)
Fadel Brahami – AEP Paphos FC (2009) 
Sofyane Cherfa – AC Omonia (2011–2014), Alki Oroklini (2018–2019)
Rafik Djebbour – APOEL FC (2014–2015)
Aikel Gadacha – Alki Oroklini (2018–2019)
Karim Mouzaoui – Apollon Limassol (2003–2005)
Idir Ouali – Ethnikos Achna FC (2021)
Nordine Sam – Nea Salamina (2008, 2009)
Bark Seghiri – APOEL FC (2006–2009) 
Bilal Hamdi – Alki Oroklini (2017–2018), Olympiakos Nicosia (2019-2020), Doxa Katokopias FC (2021)
Chafik Tigroudja – Alki Oroklini (2017–2018)
Mehdi Mostefa – Pafos FC (2017–2018)
Boussad Houche – APEP FC (2005–2006)

Angola 
Aguinaldo – AEP Paphos FC (2012), Doxa Katokopias FC (2016), AEL Limassol (2016)
Marco Airosa – AEL Limassol (2011–2018) 
Celson – Doxa Katokopias FC (2008–2009)
Carlos Chaínho – Alki Larnaca FC (2007–2008)
Chico Banza – Nea Salamina (2020)
Dédé – Olympiakos Nicosia (2010–2011), AEL Limassol (2011–2014) 
Édson – Ethnikos Achna FC (2009)
Edson Silva – Enosis Neon Paralimni FC (2015–2016)
Freddy – Doxa Katokopias FC (2007), Enosis Neon Paralimni FC (2008), AEL Limassol (2008–2011), AC Omonia (2011–2013)
Núrio Fortuna – AEL Limassol (2016–2017) 
Luwamo Garcia – Alki Larnaca FC (2011)
Gilberto – AEL Limassol (2012–2013)
Wilson Kenidy – Doxa Katokopias FC (2015–2018)
David Kuagica – Ermis Aradippou (2018–2019)
Diangi Matusiwa – APOP Kinyras Peyias FC (2010) 
Miguel – AEL Limassol (2013) 
Hélder Neto – Doxa Katokopias FC (2008)
Rudy – Doxa Katokopias FC (2016–2017) 
Stélvio – Alki Larnaca FC (2013)
Vá – Pafos FC (2019–2021)
Francisco Zuela – APOEL FC (2012–2013)

Australia 
Mustafa Amini – PAEEK FC (2021–)
Bai Antoniou – Alki Oroklini (2018) 
Oscar Crino – Anorthosis Famagusta FC (1985–1986)
Adam Foti – AEP Paphos FC (2004–2005), Olympiakos Nicosia (2008) 
Apostolos Giannou – AEK Larnaca FC (2018–2020)
Dimitri Hatzimouratis – Alki Larnaca FC (2010–2011)
Danny Invincible – Ermis Aradippou (2011)
Tommy Oar – APOEL FC – (2017–2018)
Paul Okon – APOEL FC – (2005–2006)
Robert Stambolziev – Olympiakos Nicosia (2012–2013), AEK Kouklia FC (2013–2014)

Austria 
Daniel Antosch – Pafos FC (2021–)
Andreas Dober – Ethnikos Achna FC (2014)
Armin Gremsl – Doxa Katokopias FC (2017–2020)
Michael Haunschmid – AEL Limassol (2009–2010) 
Markus Hiden – AEL Limassol (2006–2007) 
Alfred Hörtnagl – APOEL FC (1997)
Mladen Jutrić – Doxa Katokopias FC (2020)
Dino Medjedovic – Aris Limassol FC (2017)
Thomas Prager – Ethnikos Achna FC (2014–2016)
Daniel Sikorski – Pafos FC (2017–2018), Nea Salamina (2018–2019), Aris Limassol FC (2021-)
Mato Šimunović – Anagennisi Dherynia (2011–2012)
David Stemmer – Anorthosis Famagusta FC (2018-2019) 
Christoph Westerthaler – APOEL FC (1997)
Nils Zatl – Doxa Katokopias FC (2017–2019)

Argentina 
Matías Abelairas – Nea Salamina (2016–2017)
Miguel Alba – Pafos FC (2016), Ermis Aradippou (2016)
Guillermo Álvarez – Ethnikos Achna FC (2007–2008) 
Leandro Alvarez – Apollon Limassol (2006–2007) 
Francisco Aguirre – AC Omonia (2008–2009), Aris Limassol FC (2010) 
Marcos Argüello – Anorthosis Famagusta FC (2010) 
Fernando Ávalos – Nea Salamina (2009–2010)
Franco Bano – AEK Kouklia FC (2013–2014)
Alejandro Barbaro – Apollon Limassol (2016), Karmiotissa FC (2017)
Sergio Bastida – APEP FC (2005–2006), Nea Salamina (2006–2007)
Leandro Becerra – Anorthosis Famagusta FC (2014)
Mauro Bellone – Enosis Neon Paralimni FC (2020–2021)
Mariano Berriex – Aris Limassol FC (2016)
Facundo Bertoglio – APOEL FC (2016–2017)
Daniel Blanco – Ethnikos Achna FC (2006–2008), Alki Larnaca FC (2010–2011), Ermis Aradippou (2011)
Gonzalo Cabrera – Doxa Katokopias FC (2010), AEK Larnaca FC (2011) 
Roberto Carboni – APOP Kinyras Peyias FC (2011)
Fernando Cavenaghi – APOEL FC (2015–2016)
Horacio Cardozo – Apollon Limassol (2013)
Juan Cascini – APOEL FC (2018-2019)
Andrés Chávez – AEL Limassol (2021–)
Israel Coll – Apollon Limassol (2021–) 
Lucas Cominelli – Ayia Napa FC (2006–2007) 
Lucas Concistre – Anorthosis Famagusta FC (2010) 
Mariano Corsico – Olympiakos Nicosia (2007–2008) 
Emanuel Dening – Enosis Neon Paralimni FC (2020–2021)
Matias Degra – AEL Limassol (2011–2013, 2015–2016) 
Luciano De Bruno – AEL Limassol (2007–2008)
Nicolás de Bruno – AEK Kouklia FC (2013–2014)
Agustín De La Canal – Olympiakos Nicosia (2007) 
Gonzalo De Porras – Olympiakos Nicosia (2007)
Tomas De Vincenti – APOEL FC (2014–2016, 2018-)
Francisco Di Franco – AEZ Zakakiou (2016)
Federico Domínguez – Apollon Limassol (2008)
Federico Domínguez – Nea Salamina (2018)
Aldo Duscher – Enosis Neon Paralimni FC (2012)
Matías Escobar – Doxa Katokopias FC (2010), Enosis Neon Paralimni FC (2011)
Agustín Farías – APOEL FC (2017–2018)
Darío Fernández – Alki Larnaca FC (2011)
Dante Formica – Ermis Aradippou (2011–2012)
Franco Flores – Alki Oroklini (2018-2019)
Pablo Frontini – Anorthosis Famagusta FC (2010)
Emiliano Fusco – Alki Larnaca FC (2010–2013), Ayia Napa FC (2014–2015), Nea Salamina (2016–2018)
Diego Galeano – Doxa Katokopias FC (2010–2011)
Facundo García – AEK Larnaca FC (2018-2020)
Nicolás Gianni – AEK Kouklia FC (2013)
Juan Gill – Ermis Aradippou (2009–2011)
Rubén Gómez – AEK Larnaca FC (2010–2012)
Leandro Gonzalez – AC Omonia (2017)
Nelson González – AEK Kouklia FC (2013–2014)
Ramiro González – Alki Larnaca FC (2009)
Silvio González – Olympiakos Nicosia (2007), AEL Limassol (2008–2011), Aris Limassol FC (2011–2012, 2015–2017)
Francisco Guerrero – APEP FC (2009–2010)
Andrés Imperiale – Doxa Katokopias FC (2010), Aris Limassol FC (2011)
Julián Kmet – APOP Kinyras Peyias FC (2008)
Maximiliano Laso – AEL Limassol (2010–2011)
Adrián Lucero – AEK Larnaca FC (2013–2014), Enosis Neon Paralimni FC (2020–2021)
Nicolás Martínez – Anorthosis Famagusta FC (2015–2016), Apollon Limassol (2017–2018)
Federico Martorell – Ermis Aradippou (2010–2011)
Franco Mazurek – AEL Limassol (2021–)
Mauricio Mazzetti – AEK Kouklia FC (2013)
Javier Menghini – Enosis Neon Paralimni FC (2008–2009)
Vicente Monje – AEK Larnaca FC (2013)
Maximiliano Oliva – Aris Limassol FC (2013–2014), Enosis Neon Paralimni FC (2018-2019)
Emerson Panigutti – Olympiakos Nicosia (2007–2008)
Marcelo Penta – Ethnikos Achna FC (2012–2013)
Facundo Pereyra – Apollon Limassol (2018–2020)
Emanuel Perrone – Anorthosis Famagusta FC (2011)
Fabricio Poci – Ayia Napa FC (2014)
Daniel Quinteros – Apollon Limassol (2008–2011)
Federico Rasic – Pafos FC (2018-2020)
Diego Rivarola – Alki Larnaca FC (2008)
Lucas Rodríguez – Olympiakos Nicosia (2007–2008)
Ramiro Rodríguez – Olympiakos Nicosia (2012)
Facundo Roncaglia – Aris Limassol FC (2021-)
Matías Roskopf – Apollon Limassol (2020)
Esteban Sachetti – Doxa Katokopias FC (2012), AEL Limassol (2013–2015), Apollon Limassol (2015–2021)
Sebastián Salomón – Aris Limassol FC (2010)
José San Román – Nea Salamina (2019–2020)
Gastón Sangoy – Apollon Limassol (2007–2010, 2013–2015), Nea Salamina (2017)
Emmanuel Serra – Apollon Limassol (2012–2013)
Sebastián Setti – Apollon Limassol (2012)
Esteban Solari – APOEL FC (2005–2007, 2010–2012), Apollon Limassol (2013)
Nicolás Stefanelli – Anorthosis Famagusta FC (2019)
Marcelo Torres – Pafos FC (2019-2021)
Mariano Torresi – Apollon Limassol (2007–2008)
Emanuel Perrone – Anorthosis Famagusta FC (2011)
Mario Vega – Anorthosis Famagusta FC (2013–2015)
Jesús Vera – Othellos Athienou F.C. (2014–2015)
Nicolás Villafañe – AEZ Zakakiou (2016)
Martín Vitali – APOP Kinyras Peyias FC (2008–2010)
Pablo Vranjicán – AEK Kouklia FC (2013–2014)
Facundo Zabala – APOEL FC (2021–)
Gonzalo Zárate – Enosis Neon Paralimni FC (2018–2019)
Emilio Zelaya – Ethnikos Achna FC (2016–2017), Apollon Limassol (2017–2020)

Armenia 
Armen Ambartsumyan – Doxa Katokopias FC (2007), Enosis Neon Paralimni (2008–2010)
Edgar Babayan – Pafos FC (2021–)
Gevorg Ghazaryan – AEL Limassol (2019-2021)
Hovhannes Hambardzumyan – Enosis Neon Paralimni FC (2018-2020), Anorthosis Famagusta FC (2020–)
Artem Karapetyan – Anagennisi Dherynia (2016–2017) 
Romik Khachatryan – Olympiakos Nicosia (2000–2002, 2003–2005), APOEL FC (2002–2003), Anorthosis Famagusta FC (2006–2007), APOP Kinyras Peyias FC (2008), AEP Paphos FC (2009)
David Manoyan – Karmiotissa FC (2016–2017), Nea Salamina (2017)
Armen Shahgeldyan – Nea Salamina (2002–2004)
Arthur Voskanyan – Digenis Morphou (2002–2003), Ethnikos Achna FC (2003–2004)
Taron Voskanyan – Karmiotissa FC (2016–2017), Nea Salamina (2017–2018)
Artur Yuspashyan – Anagennisi Dherynia (2016)

Azerbaijan 
Araz Abdullayev – Anorthosis Famagusta FC (2017–2018), Ethnikos Achna FC (2021–)

Belgium 
Jordan Atheba – AEK Larnaca FC (2015)
Ziguy Badibanga – AC Omonia (2015–2016)
Jonathan Benteke – AC Omonia (2017)
Christian Brüls – Pafos FC (2017–2018)
Fangio Buyse – Doxa Katokopias FC (2007–2008), APOP Kinyras Peyias FC (2008–2010), AEP Paphos FC (2010–2011)
Jeff Callebaut – Pafos FC (2017–2018)
Tom Caluwé – AEK Larnaca FC (2011)
Jens Cools – Pafos FC (2018–2019)
Danilo – AEL Limassol (2020-2021), APOEL FC (2021-)
Igor de Camargo – APOEL FC (2016–2018)
Emmerik De Vriese – Ethnikos Achna FC (2015–2016), Ermis Aradippou (2016–2017)
Jimmy De Wulf – Enosis Neon Paralimni FC (2009–2012)
Laurent Fassotte – AEL Limassol (2007–2009), Enosis Neon Paralimni FC (2009–2011), Ermis Aradippou (2011–2012)
Kristof Imschoot – Enosis Neon Paralimni FC (2010–2012)
Thomas Kaminski – Anorthosis Famagusta FC (2014–2015)
Faysel Kasmi – AC Omonia (2016)
Victor Klonaridis – APOEL FC (2020-2021)
Benjamin Lambot – Nea Salamina (2019-2020)
Urko Pardo – APOEL FC (2011–2017), Alki Oroklini (2017)
Rocky Peeters – Enosis Neon Paralimni FC (2009–2010)
Luca Polizzi – Apollon Limassol (2017), Olympiakos Nicosia (2018), Pafos FC (2018–2019)
Nils Schouterden – AEK Larnaca FC (2021)
Jens Teunckens – AEK Larnaca FC (2020-2021)
Gunter Thiebaut – AC Omonia (2001–2002)
Matthias Trenson – Enosis Neon Paralimni FC (2010–2012)
Kevin Van Dessel – APOP Kinyras Peyias FC (2010–2011)
Kenneth Van Ransbeeck – Enosis Neon Paralimni FC (2015–2016)
Dieter Van Tornhout – Enosis Neon Paralimni FC (2009–2011), Nea Salamina (2011)
Stijn Vreven – AC Omonia (2005–2006)

Belarus 
Renan Bressan – APOEL FC (2016)
Igor Gurinovich – APEP FC (1991–1992)
Dzyanis Palyakow – APOEL FC (2018)
Nikolay Strizhkov – Alki Larnaca FC (2009), Ayia Napa FC (2014–2015)
Aleksandr Vyazhevich – Nea Salamina (2000–2001)

Bolivia 
Ronald García – Anorthosis Famagusta FC (2010)
Damián Lizio – Anorthosis Famagusta FC (2010)

Benin 
Khaled Adénon – Doxa Katokopias FC (2021-)
Tidjani Anaane – Doxa Katokopias FC (2021-)
John Glélé – APEP FC (2008–2009)
Mickaël Poté – AC Omonia (2014–2015), APOEL FC (2017–2018)
Félicien Singbo – AEP Paphos FC (2006–2007)

Bosnia-Herzegovina 
Delimir Bajić – Olympiakos Nicosia (2011–2012)
Bulend Biščević – AEP Paphos FC (2004)
Azer Bušuladžić – Anorthosis Famagusta FC (2021–)
Nemanja Đurović – Ethnikos Achna FC (2007)
Vladan Grujić – AEP Paphos FC (2010–2011, 2012), Aris Limassol FC (2011–2012)
Adnan Gušo – Olympiakos Nicosia (2008)
Kenan Horić – Pafos FC (2017–2018)
Sanel Jahić – APOEL FC (2011)
Ivan Jolić – Anagennisi Dherynia (2011–2012)
Dušan Kerkez – AEL Limassol (2007–2011), Aris Limassol FC (2011–2012, 2013–2014)
Mirko Mihić – Nea Salamina (1996–2000)
Branislav Nikić – Nea Salamina (2011), Ayia Napa FC (2012–2013)
Ninoslav Milenković – Enosis Neon Paralimni FC (2009–2010)
Jovo Mišeljić – Aris Limassol FC (1995–1997, 1998), Apollon Limassol (1997–1998)
Rade Paprica – APOP Paphos (1988–1991)
Vedran Pelić – Anorthosis Famagusta FC (2002–2003)
Esad Razić – AEK Larnaca FC (2007–2008)
Semir Štilić – APOEL FC (2015–2016)
Damir Suljanović – AEP Paphos FC (2006–2007), Ethnikos Achna FC (2007–2008)
Nemanja Supić – Anorthosis Famagusta FC (2009)
Nedim Tutić – AC Omonia (1992–1996), Olympiakos Nicosia (1996–1997), Ethnikos Assia (1997–1998)

Botswana 
Joel Mogorosi – AEP Paphos FC (2007), APOP Kinyras Peyias FC (2008)
Jerome Ramatlhkwane – APOP Kinyras Peyias FC (2008)

Brazil 
Ailton – Pafos FC (2021–)
Aílton – AEP Paphos FC (2006–2007)
Aílton – APOEL FC (2010–2012)
Airton – Ermis Aradippou (2020)
Alan – AEK Larnaca FC (2010–2011)
Alef – Apollon Limassol (2017–2018), APOEL FC (2019–2020)
Alexandré Pölking – Olympiakos Nicosia (2005–2006, 2007–2008), APOEL FC (2006–2007)
Alípio – AC Omonia (2013–2014)
Allan – Apollon Limassol (2017–2018)
Allyson – Ethnikos Achna FC (2012)
Anderson – Enosis Neon Paralimni FC (2012–2013)
Anderson Correia – Nea Salamina (2017–2020), Anorthosis Famagusta FC (2020-)
Anderson do Ó – AEP Paphos FC (2009–2010)
André Caldeira – AEP Paphos FC (2008–2009), AEL Limassol (2009)
André Alves – AC Omonia (2012–2013), AEK Larnaca FC (2015–2017), Anorthosis Famagusta (2017)
Andrezinho – AEP Paphos FC (2012)
Alexandre – Enosis Neon Paralimni FC (2010–2011), AC Omonia (2011), AEK Larnaca FC (2012–2013), Apollon Limassol (2015–2018), AEL Limassol (2018-2019)
Alexandre Negri – APOP Kinyras Peyias FC (2007–2009), AEK Larnaca FC (2010–2012), Doxa Katokopias FC (2012–2013, 2014–2017)
Arcelino – Alki Larnaca FC (2007–2009)
Arthur – AEL Limassol (2017)
Balú – AEP Paphos FC (2012–2013)
Guilherme Brandelli – AEK Larnaca FC (2004–2005)
Brasília – Olympiakos Nicosia (2010)
Breno – Nea Salamina (2020–2021)
Bruno Arrabal – Ethnikos Achna FC (2015–2017)
Bruno Nascimento – AC Omonia (2016–2017)
Bruno Quadros – Alki Larnaca FC (2010)
Bruno Rodrigues – Doxa Katokopias FC (2018)
Bruno Santos – AEL Limassol (2020-)
Bruno Turco – Ermis Aradippou (2015)
Caíque – Ermis Aradippou (2020–2021)
Caju – APOEL FC (2018–2019), Aris Limassol FC (2021-)
Cal Rodrigues – Enosis Neon Paralimni FC (2019–2020)
Carlão – APOEL FC (2014–2016, 2017–2019)
Carlão – Nea Salamina (2018), Doxa Katokopias FC (2019)
Carlos André – Olympiakos Nicosia (2011)
Carlos Dias – APOEL FC (2020-2021), PAEEK FC (2021–)
Cássio – AEL Limassol (2013)
César Santin – APOEL FC (2014)
Césinha – Ermis Aradippou (2013–2014)
Cesinha – Olympiakos Nicosia (2012–2013)
Clayton – Alki Larnaca FC (2007–2008), AC Omonia (2008), AEL Limassol (2009–2010)
Cleyton – AC Omonia (2016–2017)
Charles da Silva – Ermis Aradippou (2015)
Christian – APOEL FC (2013)
Dandão – Anorthosis Famagusta FC (2006–2007), Alki Larnaca FC (2007–2008)
Danilo – Nea Salamina (2020–2021)
Danilo Bueno – AEL Limassol (2016)
Danielson – AC Omonia (2012–2013)
Danielzinho – AEL Limassol (2014)
David – Doxa Katokopias FC (2007–2008), Apollon Limassol (2008–2009), Ethnikos Achna FC (2009–2010)
Davidson – AC Omonia (2009–2011)
Dellatorre – APOEL FC (2018-2019)
Denilson – AEL Limassol (2018)
Deyvison – Ethnikos Achna FC (2019-2021)
De Abreu – Olympiakos Nicosia (2010)
Dimitri – Alki Larnaca FC (2009)
Diego Barcelos – AEL Limassol (2014)
Diego Gaúcho – AEL Limassol (2013)
Diogo Melo – Ermis Aradippou (2013)
Douglão – Anorthosis Famagusta FC (2017–2019)
Douglas – Aris Limassol FC (2013–2014, 2015–2016), AEZ Zakakiou (2016–2017)
Douglas Aurélio – Pafos FC (2021–)
Dudú – Nea Salamina (2017)
Dudu Paraíba – Apollon Limassol (2016–2017)
Éder – Nea Salamina (2013–2015)
Edmar – Doxa Katokopias FC (2007, 2015–2017), Enosis Neon Paralimni FC (2007–2010), Alki Larnaca FC (2010–2011), AEL Limassol (2011–2015)
Edu Valinhos – Ethnikos Achna FC (2008)
Eduardo Pinceli – Ethnikos Achna FC (2009–2012, 2014–2017), Nea Salamina (2012), Alki Larnaca FC (2013), Aris Limassol FC (2014)
Eduardo Marques – APOP Kinyras Peyias FC (2008–2009), Aris Limassol FC (2009), AEP Paphos FC (2010–2011)
Edvaldo – AEK Larnaca FC (1998–1999)
Elias – Ermis Aradippou (2011)
Eli Marques – AEL Limassol (2011)
Elinton Andrade – Ermis Aradippou (2013)
Elízio – Apollon Limassol (2015–2016)
Elton – Apollon Limassol (2015)
Emerson – APOEL FC (2007)
Endrick – AEZ Zakakiou (2016)
Euller – AEL Limassol (2020-)
Evair – AEK Larnaca FC (1998–1999)
Evandro – APEP FC (2005–2006), Ayia Napa FC (2006–2007)
Evandro Roncatto – Ermis Aradippou (2010–2011), Anorthosis Famagusta FC (2011–2013)
Everton – Ethnikos Achna FC (2014–2016)
Evilásio – APOEL FC (2007)
Fabiano – AC Omonia (2019-)
Fabinho – Anorthosis Famagusta FC (2006–2008), Ermis Aradippou (2010)
Fabrício – Alki Oroklini (2017–2018)
Fabrício – AC Omonia (2017)
Farley Rosa – Apollon Limassol (2014–2015), AEK Larnaca FC (2016)
Felipe – Doxa Katokopias FC (2012)
Felipe Macedo – PAEEK FC (2021–)
Fillip – APOP Kinyras Peyias FC (2009–2010)
Francisco Neri – Enosis Neon Paralimni FC (2007)
Freire – Apollon Limassol (2015–2016)
Gabriel – Anorthosis Famagusta FC (2015–2017)
Gabriel Lima – APOP Kinyras Peyias FC (2007–2008), Alki Larnaca FC (2008–2009, AEP Paphos FC (2009), Doxa Katokopias FC (2010)
George – Ayia Napa FC (2012–2013)
Gilvan – Doxa Katokopias FC (2009–2011)
Gelson – APEP FC (2008–2010), Ethnikos Achna FC (2010–2011), Aris Limassol FC (2011–2012)
Gleison – AEL Limassol (2004–2005), Doxa Katokopias FC (2013–2014), Nea Salamina (2014–2015)
Gott – Aris Limassol FC (2016–2017)
Guilherme – AC Omonia (2007), Ethnikos Achna FC (2008), Atromitos Yeroskipou (2008), APOP Kinyras Peyias FC (2009), Ermis Aradippou (2009–2010)
Guilherme Choco – APOEL FC (2015)
Guilherme de Paula – Ethnikos Achna FC (2016)
Guilherme Santos – Anorthosis Famagusta FC (2016–2017)
Gustavo – Olympiakos Nicosia (2020–)
Gustavo Manduca – APOEL FC (2010–2015)
Hugo – APOP Kinyras Peyias FC (2005)
Hugo Cabral – Ermis Aradippou (2020)
Ibson – Ethnikos Achna FC (2014–2015), Ayia Napa FC (2015), Pafos FC (2016), Ermis Aradippou (2016–2017)
Igor Silva – AEK Larnaca FC (2018–2019)
Índio – Ermis Aradippou (2018-2019)
Ítalo – Doxa Katokopias FC (2019–2020)
Ivan Carlos – Alki Oroklini (2018–2019), AEL Limassol (2019)
Jackson – APOP Kinyras Peyias FC (2007)
Jaílson – AC Omonia (2017–2018), Nea Salamina (2018–2019)
Jaílson – Ermis Aradippou (2010)
Jairo – Pafos FC (2021–)
Jander – Apollon Limassol (2017–2018), Pafos FC (2018-2019)
James Dens – Alki Larnaca FC (2012–2013)
Jean Paulista – APOEL FC (2008–2010), AEK Larnaca FC (2010)
Jefferson – APEP FC (2005–2006), Ayia Napa FC (2006–2007)
João Guilherme – APOEL FC (2013–2016)
João Leonardo – Doxa Katokopias FC (2012–2017), Aris Limassol FC (2017)
João Victor – Anorthosis Famagusta FC (2015–2019)
Jocivalter – Alki Larnaca FC (2007–2008), Atromitos Yeroskipou (2008–2009)
Joeano – Ermis Aradippou (2009–2011)
Jonatan – Ermis Aradippou (2020)
Jonathan Balotelli – Enosis Neon Paralimni FC (2020–2021)
Jone – Ethnikos Achna FC (2014)
José de Souza – Ayia Napa FC (2006–2007), Nea Salamina (2008), Atromitos Yeroskipou (2008–2009), Nea Salamina (2009–2010)
Jonatas Belusso – Ermis Aradippou (2014)
Jorginho – Doxa Katokopias FC (2020)
Juan Felipe – Enosis Neon Paralimni FC (2020–2021)
Juliano Spadacio – Anorthosis Famagusta FC (2012–2013)
Juninho – Ethnikos Achna FC (2014–2015)
Juninho – Ethnikos Achna FC (2016)
Kaká – AC Omonia (2010), APOEL FC (2011–2012, 2014–2015)
Kanu – AC Omonia (2017–2018)
Kássio – AEK Larnaca FC (2007–2009), Ethnikos Achna FC (2009–2012)
Leandro – Doxa Katokopias FC (2013–2014)
Leandro Silva – Doxa Katokopias FC (2012–2013, 2015–2016), Nea Salamina (2014–2015)
Leandro Naldoni – Alki Larnaca FC (2008)
Leandro Pinto – Doxa Katokopias FC (2017)
Léo Natel – APOEL FC (2018–2019, 2021-)
Leonardo – Enosis Neon Paralimni FC (2012)
Leonardo Oliveira – Olympiakos Nicosia (2007), AEP Paphos FC (2008)
Liliu – Ethnikos Achna FC (2013), Nea Salamina (2016)
Lorran – Pafos FC (2018–2019)
Lucas Souza – AEL Limassol (2016-2017), APOEL FC (2017–2020, 2021-) 
Luciano Amaral – Apollon Limassol (2011)
Luciano – AEL Limassol (2002–2004)
Luciano Bebê – AEL Limassol (2011–2015), AC Omonia (2015–2016), Nea Salamina (2016–2017)
Lukas Brambilla – Doxa Katokopias FC (2019–2020)
Lulinha – Pafos FC (2018–2020)
Luís Carlos Lima – Doxa Katokopias FC (2017–2021)
Luiz Fernando – Doxa Katokopias FC (2014)
Magno – AC Omonia (2005–2008), AEK Larnaca FC (2008–2009)
Marcelo Oliveira – APOEL FC (2011–2014)
Marcelo Pletsch – AC Omonia (2008–2009)
Marcinho – APOEL FC (2010–2012)
Marcio Ferreira – APOP Kinyras Peyias FC (2007–2009), Aris Limassol FC (2009–2010)
Marco Aurélio – Olympiakos Nicosia (2011–2012), Ethnikos Achna FC (2012–2014), Nea Salamina (2014–2015), Aris Limassol FC (2015–2016, 2017), AEZ Zakakiou (2016)
Marco Brito – APOEL FC (2003–2004)
Marcos dos Santos – Ayia Napa FC (2014)
Marcos Tavares – APOEL FC (2007)
Marcelo – AEK Larnaca FC (2008), Ethnikos Achna FC (2009–2010)
Mário Jardel – Anorthosis Famagusta FC (2007)
Marlon Silva – Alki Oroklini (2018)
Matheus Ludescher – Alki Larnaca FC (2009), Nea Salamina (2009)
Maurício Cordeiro – Nea Salamina (2019-2020)
Maykon – AEL Limassol (2012–2013)
Mércio – Olympiakos Nicosia (2010–2012), AEK Larnaca FC (2013)
Muller Fernandes – Ermis Aradippou (2016)
Nando – PAEEK FC (2021–)
Nelsinho – Doxa Katokopias FC (2018-2019, 2020)
Neuton – Doxa Katokopias FC (2017–2018)
Packer – Ermis Aradippou (2014)
Paquito – Enosis Neon Paralimni FC (2007–2008)
Paulinho – AEK Larnaca FC (1998–1999)
Paulinho – Olympiakos Nicosia (2010–2012), Apollon Limassol (2012–2013), Ermis Aradippou (2013–2015), Doxa Katokopias FC (2015–2017)
Paulinho Carioca – Aris Limassol FC (2009)
Paulo Sérgio – Ayia Napa FC (2012–2013), AEK Kouklia FC (2014)
Paulo Vinícius – Apollon Limassol (2016–2017)
Paulo Vogt – APEP FC (2008–2009)
Pepe – Alki Larnaca FC (2009)
Peris – Apollon Limassol (2009–2010)
Rafael Jaques – APOP Kinyras Peyias FC (2008–2009)
Rafael Ledesma – Ethnikos Achna FC (2013–2014)
Rafael Santos – APOEL FC (2020–)
Rafinha – Ermis Aradippou (2020-2021)
Reinaldo – ENTHOI Lakatamia FC (2005–2006)
Ricardo Lobo – Doxa Katokopias FC (2013–2014, 2015–2016)
Ricardo Malzoni – Aris Limassol FC (2011)
Roberto Brum – Alki Larnaca FC (2011)
Roberto Dias – Ermis Aradippou (2020–2021)
Rodrigo – Doxa Katokopias FC (2008–2010), Olympiakos Nicosia (2010–2011), Nea Salamis Famagusta FC (2012)
Rodrigo Posso – Ermis Aradippou (2009–2010)
Rodrigo Silva – Nea Salamina (2010)
Rogério – Aris Limassol FC (2016–2017)
Roma – Doxa Katokopias FC (2009–2010)
Romão – AEZ Zakakiou (2016)
Robson – Ayia Napa FC (2012)
Rômulo – Ayia Napa FC (2014)
Rubens – APOEL FC (2007)
Samuel Araújo – Ethnikos Achna FC (2015–2016)
Saulo – AEP Paphos FC (2012)
Sávio – Anorthosis Famagusta FC (2008–2009)
Sidnei – Enosis Neon Paralimni FC (2011), Alki Larnaca FC (2012–2013)
Silva – Alki Larnaca FC (2007–2008), AEK Larnaca FC (2009)
Serginho – AC Omonia (2014)
Serginho – Nea Salamina (2009–2010)
Serjão – Doxa Katokopias FC (2008–2009), AEL Limassol (2009–2010), Alki Larnaca FC (2010–2011), Ermis Aradippou (2011), Ethnikos Achna FC (2012), AEP Paphos FC (2012–2013)
Thiago Ferreira – AEP Paphos FC (2010–2011), Othellos Athienou FC (2014–2015), Nea Salamina (2018–2019), AC Omonia (2019–2020), AEK Larnaca FC (2021-)
Thiago Sales – Apollon Limassol (2009–2010, 2012)
Tiago Azulão – Olympiakos Nicosia (2019–2020)
Tiago Leonço – AEL Limassol (2017)
Thuram – Aris Limassol FC (2013–2014), Apollon Limassol (2014–2016)
Tinga – APOP Kinyras Peyias FC (2007–2008), AEP Paphos FC (2008–2010)
Tininho – AEK Larnaca FC (2007–2008)
Tuta – APOP Kinyras Peyias FC (2007–2008)
Vander – AEK Larnaca FC (2014–2015), APOEL FC (2015–2017)
Valdo – Ethnikos Achna FC (2014–2015), Pafos FC (2018)
Veridiano Marcelo – APOEL FC (1998–2000)
Vinícius – APOEL FC (2013–2018), Olympiakos Nicosia (2019-2020), Nea Salamina (2020–2021)
Wellington – AEL Limassol (2015)
Wellington – Apollon Limassol (2021-)
Wender – Ermis Aradippou (2009–2011), Ethnikos Achna FC (2011–2012)
Wesley Dias – Ermis Aradippou (2020)
William Boaventura – AEL Limassol (2004–2005), Anorthosis Famagusta FC (2005–2008, 2012), APOEL FC (2010–2012)
William Soares – AC Omonia (2017–2018)
Zé Carlos – APOEL FC (2007–2008)
Zé Elias – AC Omonia (2006–2007)

Bulgaria 
Atanas Aleksandrov – Omonia Aradippou  (1982–1983)
Stanislav Angelov – Anorthosis Famagusta FC (2011–2012)
Nikolay Arabov – Anagennisi Dherynia  (1987–1988)
Milen Bakardjiev – AC Omonia (1989–1990)
Ivan Bandalovski – Anorthosis Famagusta FC (2017)
Todor Barzov – Apollon Limassol (1986–1987)
Kostadin Bashov – Alki Larnaca FC (2010–2012), AEP Paphos FC (2013), Enosis Neon Paralimni FC (2015–2016)
Krasimir Borisov – AC Omonia (1983–1984)
Atanas Bornosuzov – Aris Limassol FC (2007–2008)
Georgi Denev – Aris Limassol FC (1981–1983)
Metodi Deyanov – Anorthosis Famagusta FC (2007–2008)
Georgi Donkov – Enosis Neon Paralimni FC (2002–2003)
Spas Dzhevizov – AC Omonia (1984–1987)
Filip Filipov – Ethnikos Achna FC (2016–2018)
Hristian Foti – AC Omonia (2018–2019), Olympiakos Nicosia (2021-)
Vladimir Gadzhev – Anorthosis Famagusta FC (2017–2018)
Stanislav Genchev – AEL Limassol (2014)
Rumyancho Goranov – APOEL FC (1982–1989)
Slavcho Horozov – Omonia Aradippou (1988–1989)
Yordan Hristov – Ermis Aradippou (2016–2017)
Ilian Iliev – Apollon Limassol (2021–)
Valentin Ignatov – Anorthosis Famagusta FC (1995–1996)
Iordan Iordanov – Anorthosis Famagusta FC (1983–1984)
Ventsislav Ivanov – AEP Paphos FC (2010–2011)
Zoran Janković – Ethnikos Achna FC (2008)
Mario Kirev – Nea Salamina (2017–2018), Olympiakos Nicosia (2019-)
Ilian Kiriakov – Anorthosis Famagusta FC (1995–1996)
Rosen Kirilov – APOP Kinyras Peyias FC (2007–2008)
Bozhil Kolev – AC Omonia (1981–1982)
Nikolay Kostov – Anorthosis Famagusta FC (1990–1993)
Stanislav Kostov – Olympiakos Nicosia (2020-2021)
Todor Kyuchukov – Nea Salamina (2007–2008)
Plamen Krachunov – Ethnikos Achna FC (2016–2017)
Stefan Lahchiev – AC Omonia (1987–1988)
Dimitar Makriev – Nea Salamina (2015–2018), Ermis Aradippou (2019)
Krasimir Manolov – Alki Larnaca FC (1985–1988)
Veselin Marchev – Ayia Napa FC (2014–2015), Nea Salamina (2015)
Marquinhos – Anorthosis Famagusta FC (2011–2012)
Atanas Mihaylov – Nea Salamina (1981–1982)
Nikolay Mihaylov – AC Omonia (2017–2018)
Zhivko Milanov – APOEL FC (2016–2019)
Vasil Panayotov – Ayia Napa FC (2014–2015)
Dimitar Petkov – Aris Limassol FC (2013)
Georgi Petkov – Enosis Neon Paralimni FC (2011–2012)
Yordan Petkov – Ermis Aradippou (2011)
Ivaylo Petrov – AEK Larnaca FC (2008)
Yasen Petrov – Alki Larnaca FC (1999–2000)
Nikolay Rusev – Anagennisi Dherynia  (1983–1986), APEP FC (1986–1989)
Zahari Sirakov – APOEL FC (2002–2003)
Traiko Sokolov – AC Omonia (1982–1984)
Simeon Slavchev – Apollon Limassol (2015–2016)
Emil Spasov – AC Omonia (1987–1988)
Radostin Stanev- Aris Limassol FC (2007)
Orlin Starokin – Alki Oroklini (2018-2019), Enosis Neon Paralimni FC (2019–2020)
Borislav Stoychev – Ethnikos Achna FC (2016–2018)
Angel Stoykov – Nea Salamina (2007–2008)
Zvetomir Tchipev – Nea Salamina (2007–2008)
Nikolay Todorov – Anorthosis Famagusta FC (1995–1996)
Igor Tomašić – Anorthosis Famagusta FC (2011–2012)
Radoslav Vasilev – Alki Oroklini (2017)
Ventsislav Vasilev – Aris Limassol FC (2010, 2011)
Ventsislav Velinov – Apollon Limassol (2007–2008)
Hristo Yovov – Aris Limassol FC (2007–2008), Apollon Limassol (2008)
Adalbert Zafirov – Anagennisi Dherynia (2003–2004)
Petar Zehtinski – AC Omonia (1986–1987)

Burkina Faso 
Steeve Yago – Aris Limassol FC (2021–)
Stephane Aziz Ki – AC Omonia (2017–2018), Aris Limassol FC (2018), Nea Salamina (2018–2019)
Abdul Diallo – AEP Paphos FC (2010)
Mohamed Kone – Karmiotissa FC (2016–2017)
Issouf Ouattara – Ermis Aradippou (2015)
Dylan Ouédraogo – Apollon Limassol (2018–2019)
Blati Touré – AC Omonia (2016–2017)

Cameroon 
Hervé Bodiong – Pafos FC (2015–2016), Nea Salamina (2020)
Nicolas Dikoume – Doxa Katokopias FC (2001–2002), Ethnikos Achna FC (2002–2003)
Arnaud Djoum – Apollon Limassol (2021–)
Pierre Ebéde – AEL Limassol (2008–2009)
Charles Eloundou – Nea Salamina (2018–2020), Anorthosis Famagusta FC (2020–2021), Ethnikos Achna FC (2021–)
Richard Emmanuel Njoh – Doxa Katokopias FC (2014–2015)
Eyong Enoh – Enosis Neon Paralimni FC (2018–2019), Olympiakos Nicosia  (2019–2020)
Lewis Enoh – PAEEK FC (2021-)
Marcel Essombé – Ermis Aradippou FC (2018)
Marcelin Gando – Enosis Neon Paralimni FC (2021)
Serge Honi – Alki Larnaca FC (1998–1999), Olympiakos Nicosia  (1999–2000), AEK Larnaca FC (2000–2001)
Fabrice Kah – Olympiakos Nicosia (2019–)
Emmanuel Kenmogne – Olympiakos Nicosia (2010–2012), Ethnikos Achna FC (2012–2013)
Ibrahim Koneh – Ethnikos Achna FC (2019–2021)
Landry – Olympiakos Nicosia (2019)
Patrick Leugueun – AEL Limassol (2011)
Raoul Loé – AC Omonia (2018–2019)
Carl Lombé – Aris Limassol FC  (2008, 2009–2010, 2011–2012)
Joslain Mayebi – AEK Larnaca FC (2008)
Éric Matoukou – Pafos FC (2016)
Justin Mengolo – AC Omonia (2013–2014), Nea Salamina (2014)
Jean-Paul Ndeki – AEP Paphos FC (2010–2011)
Evariste Ngolok – Aris Limassol FC (2017–2018)
Gilles Ngomo – Alki Oroklini (2017–2018)
Roland Ojong – APOP Kinyras Peyias FC (2009–2010)
Fabrice Olinga – Apollon Limassol (2014)
Gilbert N'Djema – Aris Limassol FC (2007–2008, 2009–2010, 2011–2012)
Hervé Onana – Enosis Neon Paralimni FC (2011)
Njongo Priso – AEK Larnaca FC (2010–2011)
Edgar Salli – Olympiakos Nicosia (2021–)

Canada 
Daniel Haber – Apollon Limassol (2013–2014), Ayia Napa FC (2014–2015)
Michael Klukowski – APOEL FC (2012–2013)
Issey Nakajima-Farran – AEK Larnaca FC (2012), Alki Larnaca FC (2013)

Cape Verde 
Babanco – AEL Limassol (2016)
Bruno Leite – Pafos FC (2021-)
Jerson Cabral – Pafos FC (2019–2021)
Cafú – AC Omonia (2008–2009), Anorthosis Famagusta FC (2009–2011), AEL Limassol (2011–2012), Alki Larnaca FC (2012–2013)
Carlitos – AEL Limassol (2011–2015), AC Omonia (2016–2017)
Paulo de Pina – Olympiakos Nicosia (2011–2013), Ermis Aradippou (2013–2016)
Dady – Apollon Limassol (2012)
Delmiro – Aris Limassol FC (2021–)
Helton Dos Reis – Apollon Limassol (2011)
Edson – Aris Limassol FC (2013–2014)
Elber Evora – AEL Limassol (2021–)
Ernesto – Doxa Katokopias FC (2008–2009)
José Emílio Furtado – Anagennisi Dherynia (2016–2017)
Thierry Graça – Doxa Katokopias FC (2020)
Hernâni – Alki Larnaca FC (2007)
Janício – Anorthosis Famagusta FC (2009–2012)
José Semedo – APOP Kinyras Peyias FC (2009–2010), Apollon Limassol (2010–2011), Enosis Neon Paralimni FC  (2011–2012), Nea Salamina (2012)
Kay – AC Omonia (2017–2018)
Kévin Oliveira – Doxa Katokopias FC (2020-)
Mateus – Doxa Katokopias FC (2009)
Jimmy Modeste – AEP Paphos FC (2010–2011), Nea Salamina (2011–2013)
Néné – Enosis Neon Paralimni FC (2008)
Nilton – Ethnikos Achna FC (2007)
Nilson – AEL Limassol (2011–2012), Doxa Katokopias FC (2014–2015)
Pedro Moreira – Nea Salamina (2012)
Platini – AC Omonia (2013–2014)
Puma – Aris Limassol FC  (2007–2008), Enosis Neon Paralimni FC (2008)
Marco Soares – AC Omonia (2012–2014), AEL Limassol (2015–2018)
Lisandro Semedo – AEZ Zakakiou (2016–2017)
Sérgio Semedo – Apollon Limassol (2017)
Willy Semedo – Alki Oroklini (2017–2018), Pafos FC (2021-)
Spencer – Doxa Katokopias FC  (2009)
Toy – Doxa Katokopias FC (2012–2013)
Nélson Veiga – AC Omonia (2006–2008), AEK Larnaca FC (2008–2009)
Vozinha – AEL Limassol (2017–)

Central African Republic 
Cédric Yambéré – APOEL FC (2017)

Chile 
Pedro Campos – Olympiakos Nicosia (2020)
Nicolás Corvetto – AEL Limassol (2011)
Lucas Domínguez – Pafos FC (2017–2018)
Sebastián González – APOP Kinyras Peyias FC (2009–2010)
Mauricio Pinilla – Apollon Limassol (2009)
Alex Von Schwedler – Alki Larnaca FC (2007–2008)
Jason Silva – Apollon Limassol (2017–2018)

Colombia 
Brayan Angulo – Pafos FC (2018–2019, 2020-2021)
Roger Cañas – APOEL FC (2017)
Jairo Castillo – AEL Limassol (2007)
Yair Castro – Doxa Katokopias FC (2016–2018), Ethnikos Achna FC (2018)
Oscar Alvarado – Aris Limassol FC (2017)
Ricardo Laborde – Anorthosis Famagusta FC (2010–2013, 2018-2019)
David Mena – Apollon Limassol (2013–2014), Ayia Napa FC (2014–2015)
Jhon Obregón – Ethnikos Achna FC (2015)
Michael Ortega – AC Omonia (2019-2020)
Jeisson Palacios – Pafos FC (2021-)
Luis Arturo Peralta – Doxa Katokopias FC (2016)
Harold Reina – AEK Larnaca FC (2013), Apollon Limassol (2014)
Hámilton Ricard – APOEL FC (2004–2005)
Rodrigo Rivas – Doxa Katokopias FC (2016), Anagennisi Dherynia (2017)
Juan Camilo Saiz – Pafos FC (2020-2021)
David Solari – AEP Paphos FC (2010–2011), Alki Larnaca FC (2011)

Comoros 
Fouad Bachirou – AC Omonia (2021–)

Congo
Lucien Aubey – Olympiakos Nicosia (2012)
Bernard Itoua – Ermis Aradippou (2017–2018)
Rahavi Kifouéti – Doxa Katokopias FC (2017–2018)
Francis N'Ganga – Ermis Aradippou (2019)
Juvhel Tsoumou – Ermis Aradippou (2017–2018)

Congo DR 
Jean-Paul Boeka-Lisasi – AEL Limassol (2003–2004)
Katanga Kibikula – APEP FC (2005–2006)
Papi Kimoto – Atromitos Yeroskipou (2009)
Fabrice Lokembo-Lokaso – Enosis Neon Paralimni FC (2006–2007), Olympiakos Nicosia (2007)
Lomana Lua Lua – AC Omonia (2010–2011)
Mike Mampuya – Doxa Katokopias FC (2010–2011), Enosis Neon Paralimni FC (2011–2012)
Jessy Mayele – Ermis Aradippou (2015–2016)
Pieter Mbemba – AC Omonia (2013)
Dieumerci Ndongala – APOEL FC (2020–)
Jeff Tutuana – Enosis Neon Paralimni FC (2006–2008)
Yannick Yenga – Ermis Aradippou (2015–2016)

Costa Rica 
Steven Bryce – Anorthosis Famagusta (2005–2006)
Rónald Gómez – APOEL FC (2006–2007)
David Ramírez – AC Omonia (2018-2019)
Gonzalo Segares – Apollon Limassol (2010)
Diego Mesén – Doxa Katokopias (2022)

Croatia 
Adnan Aganović – AEL Limassol (2016, 2019-2020)
Robert Alviž – Anagennisi Dherynia (2011–2012)
Ivan Antolek – AEK Larnaca FC (2012), Ayia Napa FC (2015–2016)
Ivan Babić – Ethnikos Achna FC (2011–2012)
Matko Babić – AEL Limassol (2020–2021), PAEEK FC (2021-)
Stjepan Babić – Ethnikos Achna FC (2020)
Boris Bjelkanović – APEP FC (2008), Atromitos Yeroskipou (2009)
Mario Budimir – APOEL FC (2012–2013), Enosis Neon Paralimni FC (2015–2016)
Vinko Buden – Ethnikos Achna FC (2013)
Ivan Ćurjurić – Nea Salamina (2013–2014, 2015–2017), Ayia Napa FC (2015)
Petar Đurin – Apollon Limassol (2021–)
Jan Doležal – Ethnikos Achna FC (2020-)
Dalibor Filipović – AEL Limassol (2002–2003)
Ivan Fiolić – AEK Larnaca FC (2019-2020)
Ivan Fuštar – Nea Salamina (2018–2020)
Igor Gal – Enosis Neon Paralimni FC (2013)
Nikola Gatarić – Ermis Aradippou (2021)
Dino Gavrić – Enosis Neon Paralimni FC (2013–2014)
Dominik Glavina – Enosis Neon Paralimni FC (2019)
Toni Gorupec – Ethnikos Achna FC (2020-)
Jurica Grgec – Pafos FC (2015–2016)
Jure Guvo – Enosis Neon Paralimni FC (2002–2003)
Antonio Jakoliš – Apollon Limassol (2017–2018), APOEL FC (2019-2020)
Franko Kovačević – Pafos FC (2021–)
Krešimir Kovačević – Ermis Aradippou (2021)
Marijan Kovačević – Enosis Neon Paralimni FC (2002–2003)
Ardian Kozniku – APOEL FC (1997)
Dario Krešić – AC Omonia (2016–2017)
Tomas Maricic – Anagennisi Dherynia (2016)
Anton Maglica – Apollon Limassol (2016–2019), APOEL FC (2021-)
Dejan Mezga – Apollon Limassol (2015–2016)
Hrvoje Miličević – AEK Larnaca FC (2021–)
Igor Musa – AEL Limassol (2007–2008)
Marin Oršulić – AC Omonia (2016–2017)
Martin Pajić – Pafos FC (2021–)
Antun Palić – AEK Larnaca FC (2012–2013)
Ivan Parlov – Apollon Limassol (2012–2013)
Vilim Posinković – AEZ Zakakiou (2017)
Danijel Pranjić – Anorthosis Famagusta FC (2017–2019)
Franjo Prce – AC Omonia (2018–2019)
Davor Rogač – Ethnikos Achna FC (2017–2018)
Ante Roguljić – Pafos FC (2017–2018)
Ivan Runje – AC Omonia (2015–2016)
Krševan Santini – Enosis Neon Paralimni FC (2016)
Marko Šarlija – Ethnikos Achna FC (2012–2013)
Gordon Schildenfeld – Anorthosis Famagusta FC (2017–2021), Aris Limassol FC (2021-)
Ernad Skulić – Ethnikos Achna FC (2013)
Dino Škvorc – Nea Salamina (2013–2014)
Martin Šlogar - Aris Limassol FC (2021-)
Robert Špehar – AC Omonia (2004–2005)
Sandro Tomić – Nea Salamina (2009–2010)
Ivan Udarević – APOEL FC (2004–2005)
Ivan Vargić – Anorthosis Famagusta FC (2018–2019)
Branko Vrgoč – Anorthosis Famagusta FC (2019–2021)
Diego Živulić – Pafos FC (2018–2019)

Cuba 
Christian Joel – AEK Larnaca FC (2021–)

Curaçao 
Jarchinio Antonia – AC Omonia (2017–2018), AEL Limassol (2019)
Charlison Benschop – Apollon Limassol (2020-2021)
Boy Deul – Pafos FC (2017–2018)
Elson Hooi – Ermis Aradippou (2016)
Rangelo Janga – Apollon Limassol (2021-)
Dustley Mulder – Apollon Limassol (2014)
Gino van Kessel – Olympiakos Nicosia (2020-2021)

Czech Republic 
Martin Abraham – AEK Larnaca FC (2008)
Miloš Beznoska – Enosis Neon Paralimni FC (1990–1991)
Jiří Bobok – AEK Larnaca FC (2008–2009)
Aleš Chvalovský – Apollon Limassol (2006–2012)
Pavel Čmovš – Nea Salamina (2020-2021)
Martin Čupr – AEP Paphos FC (2006–2007)
Radek Dejmek – Pafos FC (2018–2019)
Gejza Farkaš – AEL Limassol (1984–1985)
Dušan Fitzel – EPA Larnaca (1992–1994)
Zdeněk Folprecht – Pafos FC (2018–2019, 2020), Ermis Aradippou (2021), Ethnikos Achna FC (2021-)
Ludevít Grmela – AEL Limassol (1990–1991)
Dušan Horváth – EPA Larnaca (1992–1994)
Josef Hušbauer – Anorthosis Famagusta FC (2020–)
David Kobylík – AC Omonia (2008–2009)
Martin Kolář – AEP Paphos FC (2009–2010), Apollon Limassol (2010–2012)
Zdeněk Koukal – AC Omonia (1990–1991)
Miroslav Kouřil – Evagoras Paphos (1992–1993)
Milan Kerbr – Apollon Limassol (2019)
Tomáš Kuchař – Aris Limassol FC (2005–2007)
Josef Kvída – Pafos FC (2021–)
Vladislav Lauda – AEL Limassol (1987–1988)
Jan Lecjaks – AC Omonia (2019-)
Michael Lüftner – AC Omonia (2019-2021)
Jiří Mašek – Nea Salamina (2009), APOP Kinyras Peyias FC (2010)
Miroslav Matušovič – Apollon Limassol (2009–2010, 2011–2012)
Michal Nehoda – Ethnikos Achna FC (2001–2002)
Josef Obajdin – AC Omonia (2002)
Zbyněk Ollender – EPA Larnaca (1993–1994)
Michal Ordoš – Karmiotissa FC (2016–2017)
David Pašek – Karmiotissa FC (2017)
Jan Pejša – Ethnikos Achna FC (2004–2006)
Stanislav Pelc – EPA Larnaca (1987–1988)
Pavel Pergl – AEK Larnaca FC (2007–2008)
Josef Pešice – AEL Limassol (1984–1986)
Tomáš Pešír – Nea Salamina (2009)
Miroslav Příložný – AEL Limassol (1988–1990)
Zdeněk Procházka – Omonia Aradippou (1991–1992)
Jan Rezek – Anorthosis Famagusta FC (2011–2013), Apollon Limassol (2014), Ermis Aradippou (2015)
Oldřich Rott – EPA Larnaca (1983–1984)
Stanislav Seman – Alki Larnaca FC (1984–1987)
Jiří Šourek – AEL Limassol (1988–1990)
Ondřej Smetana – Enosis Neon Paralimni FC (2013)
Vlastimil Svoboda – Aris Limassol FC (2004–2005)
Vít Turtenwald – APEP FC (2005–2006)
Zdeněk Valnoha – Olympiakos Nicosia (2004–2005)
Petr Vlček – Ethnikos Achna FC (2005–2006)
Miroslav Vodehnal – AEP Paphos FC (2004–2005), APOP Kinyras Peyias FC (2005–2006)
Jan Vorel – Aris Limassol FC (2007–2008)
Tomáš Votava – APOEL FC (2003–2004)
Tomáš Wágner – Nea Salamina (2020-2021)
Milan Zahálka – Ethnikos Achna FC (2010–2011)

Denmark 
Patrick Banggaard – Pafos FC (2018–2019)
Mikkel Beckmann – APOEL FC (2013)
Peter Gravesen – APEP FC (2009–2010)
Piotr Haren – Apollon Limassol (2000)
Mike Jensen – APOEL FC (2020)
Anders Nielsen – AC Omonia (2000–2001)
Emil Peter Jørgensen – AC Omonia (2016–2017)
Morten Rasmussen – Enosis Neon Paralimni FC (2018-2019)

Egypt 
Amir Azmy – Anorthosis Famagusta FC (2008), AEK Larnaca FC (2009), Enosis Neon Paralimni FC (2015–2016)
Karim Hafez – AC Omonia (2015–2016)
Magdy Tolba – Anorthosis Famagusta FC (1994–1995)
Amr Warda – Anorthosis Famagusta FC (2021–)

El Salvador 
Eliseo Quintanilla – Ermis Aradippou (2009)

England 
Hakeem Araba – AEK Kouklia FC (2013–2014)
Chris Bart-Williams – APOEL FC (2004–2005)
Morgan Brown – Aris Limassol FC (2021–)
David Cross – AEL Limassol (1986–1987)
Matt Derbyshire – AC Omonia (2016–2020), AEK Larnaca FC (2021–)
Sean Devine – AC Omonia (1995–1996)
Dave Esser – APOEL FC (1982–1983)
Peter Farrell – APOEL FC (1988–1989)
Michael Felgate – Enosis Neon Paralimni FC (2008–2009), Ayia Napa FC (2012–2013, 2014–2016)
Joe Garner – APOEL FC (2021)
Dean Gordon – APOEL FC (2004–2005)
Julian Gray – Nea Salamina (2011–2013)
Jordan Greenidge – AC Omonia (2018)
Tom Hateley – AEK Larnaca FC (2020–2021)
Rushian Hepburn-Murphy – Pafos FC (2020–2021)
Craig Hignett – Apollon Limassol (2005–2006)
Sam Hutchinson – Pafos FC (2020)
Jozsef Keaveny – AEK Larnaca FC (2019–2020)
Will Mannion – Pafos FC (2020–2021)
Terry McDermott – APOEL FC (1985–1986)
Ian Moores – APOEL FC (1983–1988)
Michael Ngoo – Enosis Neon Paralimni FC (2021)
George Oghani – Evagoras Paphos (1991–1992)
Gary Owen – APOEL FC (1988–1989)
James Panayi – Apollon Limassol (2002–2003)
Jason Puncheon – Pafos FC (2019–)
Omar Rowe – Enosis Neon Paralimni FC (2018)
Jay Simpson – Nea Salamina (2019–2020)
Alistair Slowe – Ayia Napa FC (2015–2016), Anagennisi Dherynia (2016–2017)
Dave Swindlehurst – Anorthosis Famagusta FC (1985–1986)
Paul Tait – Nea Salamina (2002–2005)
Simranjit Thandi – AEK Larnaca FC (2019–)
Michael Weir – Doxa Katokopias FC (2012–2013)

Equatorial Guinea 
Kike Boula – Ermis Aradippou FC (2019)
Emilio Nsue – APOEL FC (2018-2019, 2020-2021), Apollon Limassol (2019–2020)
Randy – Aris Limassol FC (2015–2016)
Rui – Enosis Neon Paralimni FC (2012–2013)
Sipo – AEK Larnaca FC (2014–2015)

Estonia 
Nikita Baranov – Karmiotissa FC (2020–2021)
Artur Kotenko – AEP Paphos FC (2010–2011)
Andres Oper – AEK Larnaca FC (2010–2011), Nea Salamina (2012–2013)
Ats Purje – AEP Paphos FC (2010–2011), Ethnikos Achna FC (2011)
Andrei Stepanov – Aris Limassol FC (2012)
Martin Vunk – Nea Salamina (2011–2012)

Finland 
Iiro Aalto – Olympiakos Nicosia (2008)
Paulus Arajuuri – Pafos FC (2019–2021), Anorthosis Famagusta FC (2021-)
Juha Hakola – Aris Limassol FC (2014)
Boris Rotenberg – Olympiakos Nicosia (2012–2013)
Berat Sadik – Doxa Katokopias FC (2017–2019, 2020-), Anorthosis Famagusta FC (2019), Enosis Neon Paralimni FC (2020)
Onni Valakari – Pafos FC (2020–)
Jani Viander – Aris Limassol FC (2004–2005)
Samu Volotinen – Apollon Limassol (2019–2020)

France 
Léonard Aggoune – Pafos FC (2017–2018)
Lamine Ba – Doxa Katokopias FC (2017–2019)
Cédric Bardon – Anorthosis Famagusta FC (2008–2009)
Éric Bauthéac – AC Omonia (2019-)
Bryan Bergougnoux – AC Omonia (2012)
Kévin Bérigaud – Pafos FC (2018, 2019-)
Kelly Berville – APOP Kinyras Peyias FC (2010–2011)
Vincent Bessat – Anorthosis Famagusta FC (2018–2019), Apollon Limassol (2019–2020)
Dylan Bikey – Doxa Katokopias FC (2017–2018)
Bruno Cheyrou – Anorthosis Famagusta FC (2010)
Amick Ciani – Doxa Katokopias FC (2012)
Alois Confais – Nea Salamina (2020–2021), Olympiakos Nicosia (2021–)
Mathieu Coutadeur – AEL Limassol (2015–2016)
Vincent Créhin – Nea Salamina (2020–2021)
Dorian Dervite – Doxa Katokopias FC (2019–2020)
Abdelaye Diakité – Alki Oroklini (2017–2018)
Kandet Diawara – APOEL FC (2021–)
Nicolas Diguiny – Apollon Limassol (2020–)
Bagaliy Dabo – Apollon Limassol (2020–)
Bruno Durant – Ermis Aradippou (2009–2010)
Dylan Duventru – Alki Oroklini (2017–2018), Olympiakos Nicosia (2019–2020), Nea Salamina (2021)
Christophe Ettori – AEK Larnaca FC (2004–2006)
Imad Faraj – AEK Larnaca FC (2021–)
Kenny Gillet – AEK Larnaca FC (2012–2013), Nea Salamina (2014)
Mickaël Gaffoor – AC Omonia (2018–2019)
Daniel Gomez – Doxa Katokopias FC (2010)
Hérold Goulon – AC Omonia (2015), Doxa Katokopias FC (2017–2018), Pafos FC (2017–2018), Ermis Aradippou (2018)
Elliot Grandin – Ermis Aradippou (2017)
Sébastien Grimaldi – APOP Kinyras Peyias FC (2008–2010)
Arnaud Honoré – Nea Salamina (2015)
Vincent Laban – Digenis Morphou (2005–2007), Anorthosis Famagusta FC (2007–2013)
Maxim Larroque – AEL Limassol (2009–2011)
David Faupala – Apollon Limassol (2018–2019)
Mamadou Kamissoko – Nea Salamina (2021)
Florian Lucchini – AEP Paphos FC (2006–2007, 2009–2010)
Jérémy Lux – AEP Paphos FC (2006–2007)
Roger Tamba M'Pinda – Apollon Limassol (2019)
Bernard Mendy – AEL Limassol (2015)
Camel Meriem – Apollon Limassol (2013–2015)
Kévin Monnet-Paquet – Aris Limassol FC (2021-)
Donneil Moukanza – Aris Limassol FC (2016)
Cédric Moukouri – Enosis Neon Paralimni FC (2011–2012)
Hilaire Muñoz – APEP FC (2005–2006)
Samuel Néva – Apollon Limassol (2009–2012)
Fayçal Nini – Nea Salamina (2009–2010)
Stéphane Noro – Apollon Limassol (2011–2012)
Christian Nadé – Alki Larnaca FC (2010)
Joshua Nadeau – AEL Limassol (2014–2015)
Di Giovanni Nouma Oum – Ermis Aradippou (2020)
Christophe Ott – APEP FC (2008)
Mickaël Panos – Pafos FC (2019–2020), Enosis Neon Paralimni FC (2021)
Bryan Pelé – AEL Limassol (2021–)
Jean-Baptiste Pierazzi – Alki Oroklini (2017–2018)
Christophe Psyché – AEL Limassol (2021)
Valentin Roberge – Apollon Limassol (2016–)
Bertrand Robert – Apollon Limassol (2013–2015), AEL Limassol (2015–2016)
Jérémie Rodrigues – AEL Limassol (2008–2009), Nea Salamina (2009–2010)
Amadou Sanokho – APEP FC (2008–2009)
Magatte Sarr – Enosis Neon Paralimni FC (2018–2019)
Anthony Scaramozzino – AC Omonia (2012–2015)
Léo Schwechlen – Anorthosis Famagusta FC (2015–2016)
Mohamadou Sissoko – Ermis Aradippou (2020)
Boubakari Soumbounou – Karmiotissa FC (2020-2021)
Kevin Tapoko – Aris Limassol FC (2018)
Florian Taulemesse – AEK Larnaca FC (2017–2021), Ethnikos Achna FC (2021–)
Nicolas Taravel – Pafos FC (2017–2018)
Chafik Tigroudja – Alki Oroklini (2017–2018)
Yoann Tribeau – Alki Oroklini (2017, 2019), Olympiakos Nicosia (2018)
Mathieu Valverde – Anorthosis Famagusta FC (2012–2015), Ethnikos Achna FC (2015)
Mamadou Wague – Ethnikos Achna FC (2014–2015)
Curtis Yebli – Ermis Aradippou (2020)

Gabon 
Shavy Babicka – Aris Limassol FC (2021-)
Frédéric Bulot – Doxa Katokopias FC (2021)
Dieudonné Londo – Digenis Morphou (2006–2007)
Alex Moucketou-Moussounda – Aris Limassol FC (2021-)
Ulysse Ndong – Othellos Athienou F.C. (2014–2015), Ermis Aradippou (2015–2016)

Gambia 
Mustapha Carayol – Apollon Limassol (2018–2019)
Jatto Ceesay – AEK Larnaca FC (2006–2007), AEP Paphos FC (2008)
Mustapha Kamal N'Daw – AEK Larnaca FC (2006–2007), Doxa Katokopias FC (2007), Enosis Neon Paralimni FC (2009)
Seyfo Soley – Doxa Katokopias FC (2011)

Georgia 
Giorgi Aburjania – Anorthosis Famagusta FC (2014–2015)
Bakhva Ambidze – AEL Limassol (2002)
Jano Ananidze – Anorthosis Famagusta FC (2020)
Guram Aspindzelashvili – Ermis Aradippou (2001–2002)
Revaz Barabadze – Ethnikos Achna FC (2016)
David Chaladze – Anorthosis Famagusta FC (2004–2005)
Soso Chedia – Olympiakos Nicosia (1992–1996)
Murtaz Daushvili – Anorthosis Famagusta FC (2019-2021), APOEL FC (2021-)
Avtandil Ebralidze – Doxa Katokopias FC (2021-)
Giorgi Gabidauri – Anorthosis Famagusta FC (2003–2006)
Nikoloz Gelashvili – Pafos FC (2015)
Irakliy Geperidze – AEP Paphos FC (2009–2010)
Paata Gincharadze – APEP FC (1996–1997), Ethnikos Assia (1997–1998)
Gocha Gogrichiani – AC Omonia (1993–1995), Nea Salamina (1995–1996)
Gia Grigalava – Pafos FC (2015), Ethnikos Achna FC (2016)
Shota Grigalashvili – Anorthosis Famagusta FC (2013–2014), AC Omonia (2014), Nea Salamina (2015), Ethnikos Achna FC (2015–2016)
Elguja Grigalashvili – Othellos Athienou F.C. (2014–2015), Pafos FC (2015), Ethnikos Achna FC (2016)
Revaz Injgia – Apollon Limassol (2021-)
Giorgi Iluridze – Ethnikos Achna FC (2016–2018)
Gocha Jamarauli – Anorthosis Famagusta FC (2005)
Kakha Kacharava – Olympiakos Nicosia (1992–1994)
Nika Kacharava – Ethnikos Achna FC (2016–2017), Anorthosis Famagusta FC (2018–2020, 2021-)
Levan Kebadze – Enosis Neon Paralimni FC (2001–2002), Ethnikos Achna FC (2005–2011)
Roin Kerdzevadze – Omonia Aradippou (1994–1995)
Temuri Ketsbaia – Anorthosis Famagusta FC (1992–1994, 2002–2007)
Gocha Khojava – Anorthosis Famagusta FC (2004–2005)
Levan Khmaladze – Othellos Athienou F.C. (2014–2015), Pafos FC (2015–2016)
Georgi Kinkladze – Anorthosis Famagusta FC (2004–2005, 2006)
Davit Kizilashvili – AC Omonia (1993–1995)
Georgi Koridze – Ermis Aradippou (2001), Onisilos Sotira (2003–2004), Olympiakos Nicosia (2004–2005)
Dimitri Kudinov – APOEL FC (1993–1994), Aris Limassol FC (1994–1995), Olympiakos Nicosia (1995–1996)
Roin Kvaskhvadze – Othellos Athienou F.C. (2014–2015), Pafos FC (2015)
Giorgi Kvilitaia – Anorthosis Famagusta FC (2020-2021), APOEL FC (2021-)
David Kvirkvelia – Anorthosis Famagusta FC (2012)
Ucha Lobjanidze – AC Omonia (2014–2015)
Georgi Loria – Anorthosis Famagusta FC (2019-)
Levan Maghradze – Aris Limassol FC (2000–2001), AEP Paphos FC (2001–2002), AEL Limassol (2002–2004), Apollon Limassol (2007–2009), Ermis Aradippou (2009–2011, 2013–2014), Ethnikos Achna FC (2011–2012)
Irakli Maisuradze – Anorthosis Famagusta FC (2014–2016), Ermis Aradippou (2016–2017), Enosis Neon Paralimni FC (2018–2021)
Beka Mikeltadze – Anorthosis Famagusta FC (2018–2019)
Amiran Mujiri – Anorthosis Famagusta FC (2005–2006)
Goderdzi Natroshvili – APEP FC (1996–1997), Anagennisi Dherynia (1997–1998)
Nika Ninua – Anorthosis Famagusta FC (2021)
Tornike Okriashvili – Anorthosis Famagusta FC (2019-2021), APOEL FC (2021-)
Giorgi Papava – Nea Salamina (2015)
Giorgi Papunashvili – Apollon Limassol (2021-)
Davit Petriashvili – Onisilos Sotira (2003–2004)
Levan Qipiani – Olympiakos Nicosia (1992–1993)
Giorgi Shengelia – Apollon Limassol (2001–2002), Digenis Morphou (2002–2003)
Mamuka Tsereteli – Nea Salamina (2002–2003)
Klimenti Tsitaishvili – Anorthosis Famagusta FC (2003–2006), AEL Limassol (2006), AEK Larnaca FC (2007), Anorthosis Famagusta FC (2008–2009), Nea Salamina  (2009–2010)
Beka Tugushi – Ethnikos Achna FC (2015)
Davit Ujmajuridze – Enosis Neon Paralimni FC (1997), Anagennisi Dherynia (1998)

Germany 
Jonas Acquistapace – AC Omonia (2014)
Heiner Backhaus – AEK Larnaca FC (2003–2004)
Uwe Bialon – Pezoporikos Larnaca (1987–1994), AEL Limassol (1994–1995)
Stefan Brasas – AC Omonia (2002–2003)
Marc Eberle – Aris Limassol FC (2009–2010)
Elvis Eckardt – APOP Kinyras Peyias FC (2008)
Thomas Epp – AEL Limassol (2000–2001)
Marco Förster – AEP Paphos FC (2008–2009)
Holger Greilich – AC Omonia (2002–2003)
Marco Haber – AC Omonia (2002–2004), Anorthosis Famagusta (2004–2006), Nea Salamina (2006–2007)
Antoine Hey – Anorthosis Famagusta FC (2001–2003)
Guido Hoffmann – AC Omonia (1997–1998)
Ronny Kockel – Olympiakos Nicosia (2005–2006)
Mustafa Kučuković – Olympiakos Nicosia (2012)
Martin Lanig – APOEL FC (2015)
Ioannis Masmanidis – Apollon Limassol (2009–2010)
Michael Kümmerle – Atromitos Yeroskipou (2008–2009)
Andy Nägelein – APEP FC (2009–2010)
Jens Paeslack – AEL Limassol (2001–2002)
Nico Pellatz – Apollon Limassol (2009–2010)
Marcel Rath – Digenis Morphou (2006–2007)
Rainer Rauffmann – AC Omonia (1997–2004)
Paulo Rink – Olympiakos Nicosia (2003, 2004–2006), AC Omonia (2006)
Thomas Scheuring – AC Omonia (2008)
Lars Schlichting – Ethnikos Achna FC (2005–2012)
Niels Schlotterbeck – APOEL FC (1997–1998)
Nils Teixeira – AEL Limassol (2018–)
Timo Wenzel – AC Omonia (2008–2011)
Fabian Wilhelmsen – APEP FC (2009–2010)

Ghana 
Godwin Ablorday – Olympiakos Nicosia (2005–2007)
Livingstone Adjin – Doxa Katokopias FC (2014)
Junior Agogo – Apollon Limassol (2009–2010)
Ernest Agyiri – Enosis Neon Paralimni FC (2019–2020)
Albert Ahulu – Doxa Katokopias FC (2014–2015)
Koffi Amponsah – Enosis Neon Paralimni FC (2008–2009)
Ebo Andoh – AEL Limassol (2012–2014)
Ernest Asante – AC Omonia (2020–)
John Arwuah – AEL Limassol (2015)
Benjamín Asamoah – Doxa Katokopias FC (2017–)
Sadat Bukari – Aris Limassol FC (2016)
Chris Dickson – Nea Salamina (2011), AEL Limassol (2012), Enosis Neon Paralimni FC (2015), Ermis Aradippou (2016)
Daniel Edusei – Ethnikos Achna FC (2008–2009)
Emmanuel Frimpong – Ermis Aradippou (2017)
Ebenezer Hagan – APOEL FC (2005)
Felix Kenu – Anagennisi Dherynia (2011–2012)
Richard Kingson – Doxa Katokopias FC (2013)
Imoro Lukman – AEP Paphos FC (2008–2010), APOP Kinyras Peyias FC (2010–2011), Nea Salamina (2011)
Kofi Mensah – Anorthosis Famagusta FC (2004–2005)
Francis Narh – Doxa Katokopias FC (2018)
Razak Nuhu – Apollon Limassol (2014), Anorthosis Famagusta FC (2014–2016)
Carlos Ohene – Alki Larnaca FC (2011–2012), AEL Limassol (2013–2016)
Peter Ofori-Quaye – AEL Limassol (2008)
Samad Oppong – Ethnikos Achna FC (2013)
Barnes Osei – Nea Salamina (2020-2021)
Kweku Seth Osei – Ayia Napa FC (2013)
Emmanuel Pappoe – AEK Larnaca FC (2007–2009)
Mustapha Quaynor – Alki Larnaca FC (2013–2014), Ermis Aradippou (2014–2016)
Yusif Rahman – Alki Larnaca FC (2011–2014)
Yaw Rush – ENTHOI Lakatamia FC (2005–2006), APEP FC (2007–2008)
Moses Sakyi – AEL Limassol (2008)
Kingsley Sarfo – Olympiakos Nicosia (2020-)
Alhassan Wakaso – Olympiakos Nicosia (2021-)
Shaibu Yakubu – Enosis Neon Paralimni FC (2011–2013)
Samuel Yeboah – Nea Salamina (2012)

Greece 
Michalis Agrimakis – Olympiakos Nicosia (2020–2021)
Christos Albanis – Apollon Limassol (2021-)
Alexandros Alexandris – APOP Kinyras Peyias FC (2006)
Georgios Amanatidis – APOEL FC (2003–2004)
Georgios Ambaris – Enosis Neon Paralimni FC (2015–2016)
Nikolaos Anastasopoulos – AEK Larnaca FC (2006–2007)
Giannis Angelopoulos – Pafos FC (2018–2019)
Kostas Apostolakis – APOEL FC (2020–2021)
Giannis Arabatzis – Ermis Aradippou (2013–2014, 2017-2019)
Nikos Arabatzis – Ethnikos Achna FC (2012)
Andreas Archontakis – Aris Limassol FC (2006–2007)
Kyriakos Aretas – Doxa Katokopias FC (2016–2017)
Dimitris Argiropoulos – Ayia Napa FC (2006–2007)
Anestis Argyriou – Ethnikos Achna FC (2015)
Grigorios Athanasiou – Ayia Napa FC (2014–2015)
Giannis Bachanelidis – Ayia Napa FC (2006–2007)
Konstantinos Banousis – Ermis Aradippou (2018–2019)
Georgios Bantis – AC Omonia (2016)
Nikos Barboudis – Ayia Napa FC (2012–2013), Ethnikos Achna FC (2013–2014), Anagennisi Dherynia (2016)
Kenan Bargan – Karmiotissa FC (2020-2021)
Thodoris Berios – Nea Salamina (2020-2021)
Vassilis Bletsas – Digenis Morphou (2004–2005)
Vassilis Borbokis – Anorthosis Famagusta FC (2006)
Kostas Chaniotakis – APOEL FC (2005–2006)
Charalabos Charalabakis – AEP Paphos FC (2006–2007)
Dimos Chantzaras – AC Omonia (2016–2017)
Christos Chatzipantelidis – Olympiakos Nicosia (2005–2006), Nea Salamina (2011)
Nikos Chatzis – APOP Kinyras Peyias FC (2007–2008), Atromitos Yeroskipou (2008), AEP Paphos FC (2009)
Dionisis Chiotis – APOEL FC (2008–2015)
Ilias Chouzouris – AEP Paphos FC (2003–2004)
Lazaros Christodoulopoulos – Anorthosis Famagusta FC (2021–)
Traianos Dellas – Anorthosis Famagusta FC (2008–2010)
Manolis Dermitzakis – AEK Larnaca FC (2005–2006)
Dimitris Diamantis – AEL Limassol (2006–2007)
Angelos Digozis – Olympiakos Nicosia (2002)
Petros Dimitriadis – Digenis Morphou (2005)
Alkis Dimitris – AEP Paphos FC (2006–2007)
Savvas Exouzidis – Aris Limassol FC (2002–2003)
Giannis Firinidis – Ermis Aradippou (2018–2019, 2020-2021)
Kostas Frantzeskos – AEK Larnaca FC (2002–2003)
Nikolaos Frousos – Anorthosis Famagusta FC (2004–2010)
Sokratis Fytanidis – Enosis Neon Paralimni FC (2019)
Theodoros Galanis – APOP Kinyras Peyias FC (2007–2010)
Aris Galanopoulos – Enosis Neon Paralimni FC (2012–2013)
Georgios Galitsios – Anorthosis Famagusta FC (2019–2021)
Iraklis Garoufalias – Olympiakos Nicosia (2020–2021)
Savvas Gentsoglou – APOEL FC (2018–2020)
Giorgos Georgiadis – AEL Limassol (2016–2017)
Angelos Georgiou – APOP Kinyras Peyias FC (2005), AEK Larnaca FC (2005)
Nikos Giannakopoulos – Aris Limassol FC (2016–2017)
Makis Giannikoglou – AC Omonia (2011–2013)
Giannis Gianniotas – APOEL FC (2016–2017), Apollon Limassol (2019-2021)
Panagiotis Giannopoulos – Ethnikos Achna FC (2014)
Dimitris Giannoulis – Anorthosis Famagusta FC (2017)
Kostas Giannoulis – Pafos FC (2018)
Kleopas Giannou – AEL Limassol (2007)
Spyros Gogolos – Ermis Aradippou (2010), Anagennisi Dherynia (2011–2012)
Giannis Goumas – Ermis Aradippou (2012)
Dimitrios Grammozis – AC Omonia (2009–2010)
Dimitris Ignatiadis – Doxa Katokopias FC (2007–2008)
Christos Intzidis – Apollon Limassol (2014)
Dimitris Ioannou – AEP Paphos FC (2012–2013)
Nikos Iordanidis – AEP Paphos FC (2004–2005)
Kostas Ipirotis – APOP Kinyras Peyias FC (2005–2006)
Kostas Kafalis – Ethnikos Achna FC (2004, 2005–2006)
Alexandros Kaklamanos – APOEL FC (2005–2006), Enosis Neon Paralimni FC (2008–2009)
Alexandros Kalogeris – Nea Salamina (2014)
Nikos Kaltsas – Anorthosis Famagusta FC (2019–)
Anastasios Kantoutsis – AC Omonia (2015–2016)
Michalis Kapsis – APOEL FC (2006–2008)
Christos Karadais – Olympiakos Nicosia (2020–2021)
Vasilios Karagounis – AEL Limassol (2015), Ermis Aradippou (2020-2021)
Christos Karipidis – AC Omonia (2009–2012), APOEL FC (2012–2013), Apollon Limassol (2013–2014)
Nikos Katsavakis – Digenis Morphou (2002–2004), Anorthosis Famagusta FC (2006–2010), Apollon Limassol (2010)
Kostas Kiassos – Anorthosis Famagusta FC (2006), Enosis Neon Paralimni FC (2011)
Dimitrios Kiliaras – AEP Paphos FC (2012)
Nikos Koliokostas – Digenis Morphou (2006–2007)
Nikos Kolombourdas – Onisilos Sotira (2003–2004)
Dimitris Kolovos – AC Omonia (2019)
Kostas Konstantinidis – Nea Salamina (2007)
Dimitris Konstantinidis – AC Omonia (2016–2017), Olympiakos Nicosia (2021)
Georgios Kostis – Olympiakos Nicosia (2004–2005), AEP Paphos FC (2006–2007), Doxa Katokopias FC (2008–2009)
Konstantinos Kotsaris – AC Omonia (2016–2017)
Stefanos Kotsolis – AC Omonia (2009–2010)
Efthimis Koulouris – Anorthosis Famagusta FC (2015–2016)
Nikos Kounenakis – Aris Limassol FC (2009–2010)
Alexandros Kouros – PAEEK FC (2021-)
Georgios Kousas – Aris Limassol FC (2018)
Vangelis Koutsopoulos – APOEL FC (2010), AEL Limassol (2011)
Nikolaos Kouvarakis – Alki Larnaca FC (2007–2008)
Panagiotis Kynigopoulos – Enosis Neon Paralimni FC (2020–2021)
Dimitris Kyriakidis – Karmiotissa FC (2020-2021)
Pavlos Kyriakidis – Ermis Aradippou (2020-2021)
Anastasios Kyriakos – AC Omonia (2009–2010)
Christos Kontis – APOEL FC (2006–2011)
Anastasios Lagos – Ermis Aradippou (2019)
Christos Lambakis – AEL Limassol (2006–2007)
Giorgos Lambropoulos – AEK Larnaca FC (2010–2011), Nea Salamina (2011–2013, 2014–2015), Ayia Napa FC (2015–2016)
Spiros Livathinos – Pezoporikos Larnaca (1987–1988)
Nikos Lougos – Nea Salamina (2017)
Konstantinos Loumpoutis – Anorthosis Famagusta FC (2007)
Nikos Machlas – APOEL FC (2006–2008)
Giorgos Machlelis – Ethnikos Achna FC (2011)
Aristidis Magafinis – Olympiakos Nicosia (2003)
Grigoris Makos – Anorthosis Famagusta FC (2013–2015)
Giorgos Makris – Anorthosis Famagusta FC (2012)
Michalis Manias – Anorthosis Famagusta FC (2020–2021)
Dimosthenis Manousakis – Ethnikos Achna FC (2008–2009)
Giorgos Manthatis – Anorthosis Famagusta FC (2019–2020)
Evangelos Mantzios – Anorthosis Famagusta FC (2010)
Vasilis Mantzis – Olympiakos Nicosia (2020–)
Markos Maragoudakis – Aris Limassol FC (2015–2018)
Spiros Marangos – AC Omonia (1998–1999), APOEL FC (2000–2002)
Stelios Marangos – AEK Larnaca FC (2013)
Demetris Maris – Aris Limassol FC (2004), Digenis Morphou (2004–2006), AEK Larnaca FC (2006–2008), AC Omonia (2008–2009), Alki Larnaca FC (2010), Doxa Katokopias FC (2011)
Antonis Markopoulos – AEP Paphos FC (2006–2007)
Charalampos Mavrias – AC Omonia (2019–2021), Apollon Limassol (2021-)
Dimitris Meidanis – Olympiakos Nicosia (2004–2006), Aris Limassol FC (2006–2007)
Pashalis Melissas – AEP Paphos FC (2012)
Nikolaos Michopoulos – AC Omonia (2003–2004)
Ilias Mihalopoulos – AEK Larnaca FC (2013)
Vassilis Mitilinaios – ENTHOI Lakatamia FC (2005–2006), Enosis Neon Paralimni FC (2006–2008)
Nikolaos Mitrou – Digenis Morphou (2006)
Dimitris Morales – Doxa Katokopias FC (2007–2008)
Thanasis Moulopoulos – Aris Limassol FC (2017–2018)
Dimitris Nalitzis – AEP Paphos FC (2006)
Giorgos Nasiopoulos – Digenis Morphou (2004–2005), APOEL FC (2005–2006)
Alexandros Natsiopoulos – Anagennisi Dherynia (2016–2017)
Vangelis Oikonomou – Karmiotissa FC (2020)
Marinos Ouzounidis – APOEL FC (2001–2003)
Leonidas Panagopoulos – Ermis Aradippou (2015–2016)
Konstantinos Pangalos – AEZ Zakakiou (2016), Aris Limassol FC (2017–2018)
Athanasios Panteliadis – AC Omonia (2016)
Efthimios Pantelidis – Doxa Katokopias FC (2007–2009)
Nikos Pantidos – Aris Limassol FC (2016–2017)
Vasilis Papadopoulos – Enosis Neon Paralimni FC (2015–2016), Karmiotissa FC (2016)
Yiannis Papadopoulos – Nea Salamina (2017–2018)
Giorgos Papandreou – Digenis Morphou (2002–2003), APOEL FC (2003–2004), Olympiakos Nicosia (2004)
Anastasios Papazoglou – APOEL FC (2014)
Fotios Papoulis – Apollon Limassol (2012–2020), AC Omonia (2020-)
Panagiotis Pappas – AEL Limassol (2006)
Anastasios Pastos – Doxa Katokopias FC (2000–2001)
Christos Patsatzoglou – AC Omonia (2009–2010)
Georgios Peglis – AEP Paphos FC (2000–2001), Enosis Neon Paralimni FC (2001–2004), Olympiakos Nicosia (2004–2006), Aris Limassol FC (2006–2007)
Dimitris Petkakis – AEP Paphos FC (2012)
Sokratis Petrou – AEP Paphos FC (2006–2007)
Thanasis Pindonis – Anagennisi Dherynia (2011–2012)
Christos Pipinis – APOEL FC (2014)
Manthos Platakis – Digenis Morphou (2006–2007)
Agathoklis Polyzos – Karmiotissa FC (2020)
Savvas Poursaitidis – Digenis Morphou (2002–2004), Ethnikos Achna FC (2004–2005), Anorthosis Famagusta FC (2005–2008), APOEL FC (2008–2012)
Stelios Pozoglou – Karmiotissa FC (2016–2017)
Stergios Psianos – Nea Salamina (2013–2014), Ayia Napa FC (2014)
Antonis Ranos – Aris Limassol FC (2016)
Spyros Risvanis – Anorthosis Famagusta FC (2021–)
Dimitris Rizos – Doxa Katokopias FC (2007–2008)
Eleftherios Sakellariou – AEZ Zakakiou (2016)
Vasilis Samaras – AEP Paphos FC (2002–2003)
Dimitris Sandravelis – Ermis Aradippou (2017–2018)
Manolis Saliakas – Karmiotissa FC (2016–2017)
Anastasios Salonidis – APEP FC (2005–2006)
Miltiadis Sapanis – APOEL FC (2007)
Lazaros Semos – Doxa Katokopias FC (2003–2004)
Giannis Sfakianakis – APOP Kinyras Peyias FC (2007–2009, 2010), Apollon Limassol (2009–2010)
Stelios Sfakianakis – Olympiakos Nicosia (2004–2005)
Giannis Siderakis – Doxa Katokopias FC (2014–2015)
Georgios Simos – AEK Larnaca FC (2006)
Stefanos Siontis – Doxa Katokopias FC (2012–2013, 2014)
Giannis Skopelitis – Anorthosis Famagusta FC (2007, 2008–2011,2012–2013), AEK Larnaca FC (2011–2012, 2013–2015), Nea Salamina (2015–2017)
Aristidis Soiledis – AC Omonia (2016–2017)
Ioannis Sotiroglou – APOP Kinyras Peyias FC (2010–2011)
Dimitris Souanis – Apollon Limassol (2012–2013)
Stavros Stathakis – Enosis Neon Paralimni FC (2012–2013), Ayia Napa FC (2014)
Evangelos Stournaras – Nea Salamina (2006)
Kiriakos Stratilatis – Alki Oroklini (2017–2018), Ethnikos Achna FC (2019–2021)
Charalambos Siligardakis – AEK Larnaca FC (2005–2006), Anorthosis Famagusta FC (2006–2007)
Giannis Taralidis – Nea Salamina (2013), Ermis Aradippou (2014–2015, 2017–), Karmiotissa FC (2016–2017)
Giorgos Theodoridis – Apollon Limassol (2012–2013)
Theodoros Tripotseris – Anorthosis Famagusta FC (2006–2008)
Savvas Tsabouris – Nea Salamina (2016–2017, 2019-2020)
Apostolos Tsilingiris – APOEL FC (2020–)
Kostas Tsironis – Aris Limassol FC (2004–2005), Digenis Morphou (2005–2006)
Giannis Tsolakidis – Karmiotissa FC (2016)
Stavros Tsoukalas – Nea Salamina (2021)
Manolis Tzanakakis – Anorthosis Famagusta FC (2015–2016)
Alexandros Tziolis – APOEL FC (2012–2013)
Stavros Tziortziopoulos – AC Omonia (2007)
Georgios Vakouftsis – APOEL FC (2002–2005), AC Omonia (2005–2008)
Giorgos Valerianos – Pafos FC (2019–2021)
Vasilis Vallianos – Enosis Neon Paralimni FC (2015–2016, 2018-2020), Ermis Aradippou (2020)
Stavros Vangelopoulos – Digenis Morphou (2006–2007)
Theodoros Vasilakakis – Anorthosis Famagusta FC (2019–2020)
Andreas Vasilogiannis – Apollon Limassol (2011), Ermis Aradippou (2015–2016)
Christos Veletanis – Ayia Napa FC (2006–2007)
Marcos Vellidis – Olympiakos Nicosia (2020)
Nikolaos Vlasopoulos – Anagennisi Dherynia (2016–2017)
Georgios Vourexakis – Aris Limassol FC (2010)
Praxitelis Vouros – APOEL FC (2017–2020)
Loukas Vyntra – AC Omonia (2016–2019)
Georgios Xenidis – Anorthosis Famagusta FC (2004–2006)
Anastasios Zafeirides – Atromitos Yeroskipou (2008–2009)
Nikos Zapropoulos – Anorthosis Famagusta FC (2006)
Nikos Ziabaris – Olympiakos Nicosia (2018)
Angelos Zioulis – AEL Limassol (2015)
Giorgos Zigogiannis – AEK Larnaca FC (2013)

Guadeloupe 
Matthieu Bemba – Ermis Aradippou (2009–2011, 2013–2015), Ethnikos Achna FC (2012), Nea Salamina (2015–2016)
Mickaël Antoine-Curier – Ethnikos Achna FC (2011)
Michaël Niçoise – Ethnikos Achna FC (2009–2010)
Kelly Irep – Enosis Neon Paralimni FC (2020-2021)

Guatemala 
Gerardo Gordillo – Enosis Neon Paralimni FC (2013)

Guinea 
Demba Camara – Anorthosis Famagusta FC (2017–2018)
Fousseni Bamba – Ayia Napa FC (2014–2016)
Kaba Diawara – Alki Larnaca FC (2008)
Jean Fernandez – Doxa Katokopias FC (2018-2019)
José Kanté – AEK Larnaca FC (2014–2015)
Alhassane Keita – Ermis Aradippou (2015–2016)
Sekou Keita – Ermis Aradippou (2018)
Baissama Sankoh – Nea Salamina (2020-2021)
Lancinet Sidibe – Ermis Aradippou (2020-2021)
Ousmane Sidibé – Olympiakos Nicosia (2019)
Richard Soumah – Apollon Limassol (2018–2019)

Guinea-Bissau 
Aldair – AEL Limassol (2017–2018)
Abel Camará – Pafos FC (2017–2018)
Mamadu Candé – AC Omonia (2017–2018)
Dionisio – AEK Larnaca FC (2008)
Ednilson – AEK Larnaca FC (2008)
Bruno Fernandes – Alki Larnaca FC (2011–2013)
Esmaël Gonçalves – APOEL FC (2013), Anorthosis Famagusta FC (2015)
Braíma Injai – Olympiakos Nicosia (2007–2008)
Kaby – AEL Limassol (2012)
Daniel Kenedy – APOEL FC (2005–2006)
Malá – Doxa Katokopias FC (2009)
Mesca – AEL Limassol (2015–2018), Doxa Katokopias FC (2019-)
Nani – Olympiakos Nicosia (2019–)
Romário Baldé – Doxa Katokopias FC (2021-)
Sambinha – Olympiakos Nicosia (2019–)
Zezinho – AEL Limassol (2014)

Haiti 
Gary Ambroise – Doxa Katokopias FC (2014)
Kervens Belfort – Ethnikos Achna FC (2015)
Frantz Bertin – Alki Larnaca FC (2011)
Wilde-Donald Guerrier – Apollon Limassol (2021)
Kevin Lafrance – AEL Limassol (2016–2019), Pafos FC (2019-2020), AEK Larnaca FC (2021), Doxa Katokopias FC (2021-)
Jean-Eudes Maurice – Nea Salamina (2015)
Soni Mustivar – Nea Salamina (2021)
Emmanuel Sarki – AEL Limassol (2016)

Honduras 
Allan Lalín – Nea Salamina (2013)

Hungary 
Norbert Balogh – APOEL FC (2018–2019)
Gábor Bardi – AEP Paphos FC (2003–2004), APOP Kinyras Peyias FC (2006–2010)
Balázs Berdó – Digenis Morphou (2006–2007)
Levente Bozsik – Anagennisi Dherynia (2003–2004)
Zoltán Bükszegi – Nea Salamina (2005–2006)
József Dzurják – AC Omonia (1991–1993)
Norbert Farkas – Digenis Morphou (2006–2007)
Róbert Fekete – AEP Paphos FC (2004–2005)
Károly Graszl – Nea Salamina (2012–2013)
Ádám Gyurcsó – AEK Larnaca FC (2021–)
Tamás Juhár – Nea Salamina (2005–2007)
Szabolcs Kemenes – Ethnikos Achna FC (2007–2008)
Zoltán Kenesei – AEK Larnaca FC (2002–2003)
József Kiprich – APOEL FC (1995–1997)
Gábor Korolovszky – AC Omonia (2003–2005), Apollon Limassol (2005–2008), Aris Limassol FC (2009–2010)
Béla Kovács – Alki Larnaca FC (2004–2005)
Dániel Kovács – APEP FC (2009–2010)
Kálmán Kovács – APOEL FC (1995–1996)
Zoltán Kovács – Aris Limassol FC (2011–2012, 2013–2014), Nea Salamina (2012)
István Kozma – APOEL FC (1995–1997)
Ádám Lang – AC Omonia (2019-)
Leandro – AC Omonia (2010–2015)
Miklós Lendvai – Aris Limassol FC (2004–2005)
Tibor Márkus – Apollon Limassol (2006), Digenis Morphou (2006–2007)
Géza Mészöly – AEL Limassol (1997–1998)
Gábor Nagy – APEP FC (2008–2010)
Zoltán Nagy – Alki Larnaca (2004–2005), Anorthosis Famagusta FC (2005–2006, 2007–2010), Digenis Morphou (2006–2007), Doxa Katokopias FC (2010–2011)
Zsolt Nagy – Atromitos Yeroskipou (2008)
Krisztián Pest – APOP Kinyras Peyias FC (2005–2006)
Zsolt Posza – Doxa Katokopias FC (2010)
Zoltan Sabo – AEK Larnaca FC (2003–2004)
Roland Sallai – APOEL FC (2017–2018)
Balázs Schrancz – APOP Kinyras Peyias FC (2005–2006)
József Sebök – AEL Limassol (2000–2004, 2005)
Ákos Seper – APEP FC (2005–2006), Aris Limassol FC (2006–2008)
Norbert Sipos – Nea Salamina (2009)
Thomas Sowunmi – APOP Kinyras Peyias FC (2011)
Attila Szalai – Apollon Limassol (2019–2021)
Tamás Szamosi – Nea Salamina (2004–2008)
Attila Szili – APEP FC (2008–2009)
Barnabás Sztipánovics – APOEL FC (2002–2003), Olympiakos Nicosia (2003–2004)
Lajos Terjék – Enosis Neon Paralimni FC (2004–2006)
Attila Tököli – Anorthosis Famagusta FC (2005), AEL Limassol (2006)
Gábor Torma – AEL Limassol (2004)
Dániel Totka – APEP FC (2009–2010)
Gábor Vayer – Digenis Morphou (2005–2006)
Ádám Vezér – Anagennisi Dherynia (2003–2004), AC Omonia (2004–2007), Alki Larnaca FC (2007–2008)
Gábor Vincze – Ethnikos Achna FC (2006–2007)
Paulo Vinícius – APOEL FC (2021–)
Aladár Virágh – Atromitos Yeroskipou (2008), Anagennisi Dherynia (2011)
Géza Vlaszák – AEL Limassol (2006–2007)
Róbert Waltner – Anorthosis Famagusta FC (2003)
Gábor Zavadszky – Apollon Limassol (2004–2006)
Zalán Zombori – Alki Larnaca FC (2004–2005)
János Zováth – AEP Paphos FC (2004–2005)

Iceland 
Kári Árnason – AC Omonia (2017)
Haraldur Freyr Guðmundsson – Apollon Limassol (2009)
Björn Bergmann Sigurðarson – APOEL FC (2020)

Iran 
Ferydoon Zandi – Apollon Limassol (2006–2007), Olympiakos Nicosia (2008), Alki Larnaca FC (2008–2009)
Ali Parhizi – APEP FC (2009–2010)
Reza Ghoochannejhad – APOEL FC (2018)

Iraq 
Mahdi Karim – Apollon Limassol (2006–2007)
Hawar Mulla Mohammed – Apollon Limassol (2006–2007), Anorthosis Famagusta FC (2008–2009)
Mohammed Nasser – Apollon Limassol (2006–2007)
Haidar Obeid – Apollon Limassol (2006–2007)
Jassim Swadi Arig – Apollon Limassol (2005–2007)

Ireland 
Jack Byrne – APOEL FC (2021)
Matthew Cassidy – Enosis Neon Paralimni FC (2008–2010), AEL Limassol (2010)
Robbie Gibbons – Alki Larnaca FC (2011), Ermis Aradippou (2011)
Cillian Sheridan – APOEL FC (2013–2015), AC Omonia (2015–2017)

Israel 
Hasan Abu Zaid – AEK Larnaca FC (2014)
Amir Agayev – AC Omonia (2016)
Lior Asulin – Apollon Limassol (2008)
Omer Atzili – APOEL FC (2020)
Yaniv Azran – Enosis Neon Paralimni FC (2006)
Roy Bakal – Alki Larnaca FC (2012–2013)
Dudu Biton – APOEL FC (2013)
David Ben Dayan – AC Omonia (2012)
Amit Ben Shushan – Anorthosis Famagusta FC (2013–2014)
Roberto Colautti – Anorthosis Famagusta FC (2013–2014), AEK Larnaca FC (2014–2015)
Baruch Dego – Nea Salamina (2010), Apollon Limassol (2010–2011)
Hen Ezra – AC Omonia (2019)
Shoval Gozlan – Enosis Neon Paralimni FC (2019)
Ariel Harush – Anorthosis Famagusta FC (2017–2018)
Guy Haimov – AEK Larnaca FC (2012–2013)
Eden Hershkovitz – Karmiotissa FC (2021)
Nisso Kapiloto – Alki Larnaca FC (2012–2013)
Boris Klaiman – Enosis Neon Paralimni FC (2018–2020)
Ohad Levita – AC Omonia (2012–2013)
Nir Mansour – Ayia Napa FC (2014)
Haim Megrelashvili – Alki Larnaca FC (2010–2011), AEK Larnaca FC (2013–2014)
Erez Mesika – AEK Larnaca FC (2008–2009)
Dor Micha – Anorthosis Famagusta FC (2020–2021)
Moshe Mishaelof – Apollon Limassol (2009), AEP Paphos FC (2010)
Moshe Ohayon – Anorthosis Famagusta FC (2012–2014)
Yarin Peretz – Karmiotissa FC (2020–2021)
Uri Peso – Ayia Napa FC (2012–2013)
Idan Sade – Enosis Neon Paralimni FC (2012)
Ben Sahar – APOEL FC (2020-2021)
Yuval Spungin – AC Omonia (2010–2013)
Ram Strauss – Nea Salamina (2014–2015)
Avi Tikva – Enosis Neon Paralimni FC (2004–2005)
Yehiel Tzagai – APOP Kinyras Peyias FC (2010)
Zion Tzemah – Enosis Neon Paralimni FC (2014)
Assaf Tzur – Anorthosis Famagusta FC (2020–)
Barak Yitzhaki – Anorthosis Famagusta FC (2012–2013)

Italy 
Mattia Cinquini – Enosis Neon Paralimni FC (2014), Nea Salamina (2014–2016)
Bruno Cirillo – Alki Larnaca FC (2012)
Michele Di Piedi – APOEL FC (2004–2005)
Marco Fortin – AEK Larnaca FC (2010–2012)
Luigi Gennamo – APEP FC (2009–2010)
Davide Grassi – Aris Limassol FC (2013–2014), Nea Salamina (2016–2017)
Gaetano Monachello – Olympiakos Nicosia (2013)
Marco Motta – AC Omonia (2018-2019)
Pasquale Sbarra – APEP FC (2009–2010)
Simone Scuffet – APOEL FC (2021–)

Ivory Coast 
Jean Luc Assoubre – AEK Larnaca FC (2018–2019), Ethnikos Achna FC (2021-)
Christo Amessan – Ethnikos Achna FC (2013–2014)
Adama Bamba – Doxa Katokopias FC (2012–2013)
Siaka Bamba – Nea Salamina (2014)
Lionel Bah – APOP Kinyras Peyias FC (2008–2009)
Sekou Cissé – Anorthosis Famagusta FC (2017–2018)
Joël Damahou – Pafos FC (2015–2016), Nea Salamina (2017–2018)
Franck-Augustin Dia – APEP FC (2005–2006)
Gilles Domoraud – Nea Salamina (2007–2008)
Gaoussou Fofana – Doxa Katokopias FC (2012–2013, 2015–2017), Anorthosis Famagusta FC (2013–2014), AC Omonia (2014–2015), Ermis Aradippou (2017)
Félicien Gbedinyessi – AEZ Zakakiou (2016–2017)
Abraham Gneki Guié – Apollon Limassol (2013–2017)
Aboubakar Karamoko – Doxa Katokopias FC (2020–2021)
Erwin Koffi – Anorthosis Famagusta FC (2018–2020), Olympiakos Nicosia (2020)
Brahima Bruno Koné – Ermis Aradippou (2020-2021)
Aimé Koudou – AEL Limassol (2005–2006)
Franck Madou – APOP Kinyras Peyias FC (2010)
Lamine N'dao – Doxa Katokopias FC (2012–2013), Olympiakos Nicosia (2013)
Serge Alain Liri – APOP Kinyras Peyias FC (2008–2011)
Romaric – AC Omonia (2015–2016)
Aly Savane – AEL Limassol (2016–2017)
Ibrahim Sissoko – Doxa Katokopias FC (2017–2018)
Vouho – AEL Limassol (2011–2013)
Landry Zahana-Oni – AEL Limassol (2004–2007)
Goba Zakpa – Ethnikos Achna FC (2020–)

Japan 
Cy Goddard – Pafos FC (2019–2020)

Jordan 
Odai Al-Saify – Alki Larnaca FC (2010–2011)
Musa Al-Taamari – APOEL FC (2018–2020)
Omar Hani – APOEL FC (2019–2020), Olympiakos Nicosia (2020-2021)

Kazakhstan 
Oleg Litvinenko – Ermis Aradippou (2001–2002)
Magomed Paragulgov – Ermis Aradippou (2020)
Viktor Zubarev – Apollon Limassol (2000–2002)

Korea Republic 
Jong-In Park – Nea Salamina (2017)

Kosovo 
Donis Avdijaj – AEL Limassol (2021)
Genc Iseni – Ethnikos Achna FC (2008)
Krasniqi Kreshnic – Ethnikos Achna FC (2014, 2015–2016)
Sokol Maliqi – APEP FC (2009–2010)
Atdhe Nuhiu – APOEL FC (2020-2021)

Latvia 
Vitālijs Artjomenko – AEP Paphos FC (2010–2011)
Antonijs Černomordijs – Pafos FC (2017)
Vladislavs Gabovs – Pafos FC (2017–2018)
Artūrs Karašausks – Ethnikos Achna FC (2021–)
Oļegs Karavajevs – Evagoras Paphos (1993–1994)
Jānis Krūmiņš – Pafos FC (2015–2016)
Marians Pahars – Anorthosis Famagusta FC (2006–2007)
Andrejs Pavlovs – AEP Paphos FC (2010–2011), Olympiakos Nicosia (2011)
Deniss Rakels – Pafos FC (2019, 2020-2021)
Vitālijs Rečickis – Aris Limassol FC (2010)
Reinis Reinholds – Pafos FC (2019–2020)
Valērijs Šabala – Anorthosis Famagusta FC (2014)
Jevgēņijs Sazonovs – Ethnikos Achna FC (2011–2012)
Pāvels Šteinbors – Nea Salamina (2015–2016)
Igors Tarasovs – Ethnikos Achna FC (2021–)
Artūrs Vaičulis – AEP Paphos FC (2009–2010), AEL Limassol (2010–2011)

Lebanon 
Zakaria Charara – Ermis Aradippou (2011)
Bassel Jradi – Apollon Limassol (2021-)

Liberia 
George Gebro – ENTHOI Lakatamia FC (2005–2006), AEL Limassol (2006–2007), Ethnikos Achna FC (2007)
Solomon Grimes – Nea Salamina (2011–2013, 2014–2016)
Alvin Kieh – Anorthosis Famagusta FC (2002–2003), Onisilos Sotira (2003–2004)
Brem Soumaoro – PAEEK FC (2021–)
Tonia Tisdell – Nea Salamina (2019–2020)
Theo Weeks – Ermis Aradippou (2015–2016, 2017), Alki Oroklini (2019)
Peter Wilson – Olympiakos Nicosia (2021–)
Samuel Wowoah – Enosis Neon Paralimni FC (2006–2007)

Lithuania 
Rolandas Baravykas – Nea Salamina (2020)
Vytautas Černiauskas – Ermis Aradippou (2016)
Edgaras Jankauskas – AEK Larnaca FC (2007)
Šarūnas Jurevičius – APOP Kinyras Peyias FC (2010)
Tomas Ražanauskas – Anorthosis Famagusta FC (2004–2005)
Ernestas Šetkus – Olympiakos Nicosia (2010–2012), Nea Salamina (2013–2014)
Emilijus Zubas – AEK Larnaca FC (2013)

Luxembourg 
Tim Hall – Ethnikos Achna FC (2021-)
Vahid Selimović – Apollon Limassol (2019-2020)

Macau 
Filipe Duarte – Apollon Limassol (2005–2007)

Malawi 
Tawonga Chimodzi – AEZ Zakakiou (2016–2017)

Mali 
Mamadi Berthe – Olympiakos Nicosia (2008)
Mamadou Djikiné – Olympiakos Nicosia (2012–2013)
Tenema N'Diaye – Nea Salamina (2013)
Bakary Sako – Pafos FC (2019-2020)
Mahamadou Sidibè – Ethnikos Achna FC (2008–2009), AC Omonia (2009–2010)

Malta 
Orosco Anonam – APOEL FC (2002)
Steve Borg – Aris Limassol FC (2015–2016)
Luke Dimech – AEK Larnaca FC (2010–2012)
Andrew Hogg – Enosis Neon Paralimni FC (2012–2013)
Udo Nwoko – Doxa Katokopias FC (2010)
André Schembri – AC Omonia (2012–2014, 2015–2016), Apollon Limassol (2017–2019)

Martinique 
Christopher Glombard – Alki Oroklini (2018), Ethnikos Achna FC (2019–2020)
Geoffrey Malfleury – Alki Oroklini (2018)

Mauritania 
Dominique Da Silva – Ermis Aradippou (2016)
Diallo Guidileye – AEL Limassol (2014–2015)
Moise Kandé – AEL Limassol (2007–2008)
Yoann Langlet – Enosis Neon Paralimni FC (2012–2013)

Mauritius 
Kévin Bru – Apollon Limassol (2018-2019)

Mexico 
Jorge Enríquez – AC Omonia (2018)
Raúl Gudiño – APOEL FC (2017–2018)
Édgar Pacheco – Ermis Aradippou (2017–2018)

Moldova 
Evgheni Hmaruc – Nea Salamina (2002–2003)

Montenegro 
Srđan Blažić – Anorthosis Famagusta FC (2012), Nea Salamina (2013–2014)
Vladimir Boljević – AEK Larnaca FC (2014–2017), Doxa Katokopias FC (2018-2021)
Mijuško Bojović – Enosis Neon Paralimni FC (2015–2016)
Miodrag Božović – APOP Paphos (1996–1997)
Siniša Dobrasinović – Apollon Limassol (2000–2002), Digenis Morphou (2002–2005), AC Omonia (2005–2008), Anorthosis Famagusta FC  (2008–2009)
Radislav Dragićević – APOP Kinyras Peyias FC (2005–2006)
Andrija Dragojević – Karmiotissa FC (2016–2017)
Dragan Đukanović – AC Omonia (1995–1996)
Duško Đurišić – Apollon Limassol (2008–2009)
Vanja Grubač – Digenis Morphou (2003–2004)
Sergej Grubač – APOEL FC (2017–2018)
Deni Hočko – Pafos FC (2021-)
Vasko Kalezić – Anagennisi Dherynia (2016)
Petar Kasom – AEP Paphos FC (2006–2007)
Dragan Maraš – AEP Paphos FC (2004)
Dejan Peković – Apollon Limassol (1999–2000)
Goran Perišić – Olympiakos Nicosia (2001–2002)
Miloš Radanović – Olympiakos Nicosia (2006–2007)
Dušan Radojević – Ethnikos Achna FC (1998–1999)
Aleksandar Madžar – AEP Paphos FC (2003–2004)
Savo Pavićević – AC Omonia (2012), Anorthosis Famagusta FC (2013–2014)
Momčilo Rašo – AEL Limassol (2018, 2019–2021)
Marko Vidović – Anorthosis Famagusta FC (2010)
Vladimir Volkov – Ermis Aradippou (2018)
Mihajlo Vujačić – Alki Larnaca FC (2002–2003)
Nikola Vukčević – Ethnikos Achna FC (2011–2012)
Simon Vukčević – Enosis Neon Paralimni FC (2015–2016)
Dejan Vukićević – Pezoporikos Larnaca (1993–1994)

Montserrat 
Corrin Brooks-Meade – Alki Larnaca FC (2010–2013), Ermis Aradippou (2011–2012), AC Omonia (2013–2014), Nea Salamina (2014–2015), Ethnikos Achna FC (2015–2016)
Kenny Dyer – Nea Salamina (1988–1991), Ethnikos Achna FC (1992–1995, 1996–1999)

Morocco 
Samir Bengelloun – APOP Kinyras Peyias FC (2008–2010)
Tarik Bengelloun – Enosis Neon Paralimni FC (2011)
Chakib Benzoukane – Apollon Limassol (2012)
Mohammed Chaouch – APOEL FC (1999–2000)
Issam Chebake – APOEL FC (2021–)
Karim Fegrouche – AEL Limassol (2013–2015)
Rachid Hamdani – Apollon Limassol (2011–2015)
Amine Khammas – Apollon Limassol (2021–)
Abdelkarim Kissi – Enosis Neon Paralimni FC (2007–2008), Apollon Limassol (2008), AEK Larnaca FC (2009), Ermis Aradippou (2009–2010), Ethnikos Achna FC (2010–2012)
Ryan Mmaee – AEL Limassol (2019–2021)
Hamid Rhanem – Ayia Napa FC (2007), Enosis Neon Paralimni FC (2007), AEK Larnaca FC (2008), APOP Kinyras Peyias FC (2009)
Khalid Sinouh – AC Omonia (2005–2006)
Anuar Tuhami – APOEL FC (2020–2021)
Jaouad Zairi – Anorthosis Famagusta FC (2012)

Mozambique 
Fumo – Atromitos Yeroskipou (2008), APEP FC (2009)
Genito – Nea Salamina (2009–2010)
Eduardo Jumisse – Ermis Aradippou (2011)
Manuel Lopes – APOP Kinyras Peyias FC (2011)
Dário Monteiro – Nea Salamina (2007–2008)
Nuro Tualibudane – Nea Salamina (1997–1998)

Netherlands 
Kiran Bechan – Ermis Aradippou (2009–2010)
Hans Borsboom – APOP Paphos FC (1987–1988)
Pim Bouwman – Enosis Neon Paralimni FC (2015–2016), Ermis Aradippou (2016–2017, 2018)
Nicandro Breeveld – AC Omonia (2017–2018)
Joost Broerse – APOEL FC (2008–2011)
Marvin Brunswijk – Anorthosis Famagusta FC (2002–2003)
Simo Choukoud – Pafos FC (2018–2019)
Jürgen Colin – Anorthosis Famagusta FC (2011–2013)
Martin Cruijff – AEK Larnaca FC (2002–2003)
Tom Daemen – AEK Larnaca FC (2012–2013), Enosis Neon Paralimni FC (2013), Aris Limassol FC (2014)
Tijn Daverveld – AEL Limassol (2021–)
Jordy Deckers – Ermis Aradippou (2016)
Donny de Groot – AEK Larnaca FC (2006–2007)
Tim de Cler – AEK Larnaca FC (2011–2013)
Lorenzo Ebecilio – APOEL FC (2017–2018)
Bert Esselink – PAEEK FC (2021-)
Navarone Foor – Pafos FC (2020-)
Serginho Greene – AEK Larnaca FC (2013, 2014), Othellos Athienou F.C. (2015)
Kevin Hofland – AEK Larnaca FC (2010–2012)
Nicky Hofs – AEL Limassol (2010–2011)
Pascal Heije – APEP FC (2009)
Hector Hevel – AEK Larnaca FC (2017–2020)
Fouad Idabdelhay – AEL Limassol (2013–2014)
Kevin Jansen – PAEEK FC (2021-)
René Klomp – Ethnikos Achna FC (2002–2003)
Jeffrey Leiwakabessy – Anorthosis Famagusta FC (2008–2011)
Edwin Linssen – AEK Larnaca FC (2010–2013)
Nassir Maachi – AEK Larnaca FC (2012–2014), Pafos FC (2015–2016), Nea Salamina (2016–2017), Alki Oroklini (2018)
Darren Maatsen – Ayia Napa FC (2015)
Hedwiges Maduro – AC Omonia (2017–2018)
Hilmi Mihçi – Enosis Neon Paralimni FC (2006)
Cendrino Misidjan – Ermis Aradippou (2015)
Beau Molenaar – Apollon Limassol (2007)
Junas Naciri – Enosis Neon Paralimni FC (2006–2007)
Rene Osei Kofi – Aris Limassol FC (2013)
Humphrey Rudge – Apollon Limassol (2004–2005)
Danny Schenkel – AEK Larnaca FC (2010–2011)
Bernard Schuiteman – Apollon Limassol (2002–2003)
Stefano Seedorf – Apollon Limassol (2007)
Joost Terol – AEP Paphos FC (2008)
Thijs Timmermans – PAEEK FC (2021-)
Arsenio Valpoort – Ermis Aradippou (2021)
Pele van Anholt – Enosis Neon Paralimni FC (2020–2021)
Jochem van der Hoeven – AEP Paphos FC (2004–2005)
Gregoor van Dijk – AEK Larnaca FC (2010–2013)
Ronny Van Es – AEP Paphos FC (2008)
John van Loen – APOEL FC (1988–1989)
Piet Velthuizen – AC Omonia (2017)
Boy Waterman – APOEL FC (2015–2020)
Nordin Wooter – Anorthosis Famagusta FC (2005–2006), AEK Larnaca FC (2007)
Mike Zonneveld – AEL Limassol (2010–2011)

Netherlands Antilles 
Civard Sprockel – Anorthosis Famagusta FC (2011–2012), Othellos Athienou F.C. (2015)
Raymond Victoria – AEK Larnaca FC (2006–2007)

New Zealand 
Billy Wright – Apollon Limassol (1983–1984)

Nigeria 
Shehu Abdullahi – Anorthosis Famagusta FC (2016–2018), AC Omonia (2020-)
Mutiu Adepoju – AEL Limassol (2003–2004)
Kabiru Akinsola – Doxa Katokopias FC (2013)
Abdul Jeleel Ajagun – AC Omonia (2019)
Rasheed Alabi – Doxa Katokopias FC (2007–2008), AC Omonia (2008–2014), Pafos FC (2015–2016)
Yakubu Alfa – AEK Larnaca FC (2011–2012)
Jeremiah Ani – APOP Kinyras Peyias FC (2011)
Iyayi Atiemwen – AC Omonia (2021-)
Haruna Babangida – Apollon Limassol (2007–2009)
Femi Balogun – Ermis Aradippou (2015)
Mathew Boniface – Aris Limassol FC (2015–2016)
George Datoru – AEK Larnaca FC (2004–2006)
Babajide David – AC Omonia (2020)
Efion Egbeniogh – Onisilos Sotira (2003–2004)
Eric Ejiofor – Enosis Neon Paralimni FC (2005–2009)
Richard Eromoigbe – Anorthosis Famagusta FC (2011)
Andrew Esealuka – APEP FC (2008), Aris Limassol FC (2009)
Joseph Femi – Ayia Napa FC (2015)
Nosa Igiebor – Anorthosis Famagusta FC (2018–2019)
Harmony Ikande – Aris Limassol FC (2016)
Fidelis Irhene – AEL Limassol (2017–2019), Doxa Katokopias FC (2019)
Blessing Kaku – Enosis Neon Paralimni FC (2008)
Sani Kaita – Olympiakos Nicosia (2012)
Felix Kennedy – AEP Paphos FC (2006–2007)
Sunny Kingsley – AEK Larnaca FC (2006–2008, 2010–2012)
Pascal Kondaponi – Ayia Napa FC (2007)
Henry Makinwa – AEP Paphos FC (2004–2005)
Joseph Nwafor – Doxa Katokopias FC (2002–2003), AEK Larnaca FC (2008)
Charles Obi – Doxa Katokopias FC (2008)
Michael Obiku – Anorthosis Famagusta FC (1989–2002, 1999–2000), APOEL FC (2000–2001)
Wole Odegbami – EPA Larnaca FC (1989–1991), Enosis Neon Paralimni FC (1991–1993)
Felix Ogbuke – Apollon Limassol (2010–2011)
Ganiu Ogungbe – AC Omonia (2013–2014), Ethnikos Achna FC (2014–2016)
Eze Vincent Okeuhie – Apollon Limassol (2013–2014), Nea Salamina (2014–2015), AC Omonia (2015–2016)
Emmanuel Okoduwa – Enosis Neon Paralimni FC (2012–2013)
Ejike Okoh – Ermis Aradippou (2020–2021)
Charles Okonkwo – AC Omonia (1989)
Victor Olatunji – AEK Larnaca FC (2021-)
Azubuike Oliseh – AEK Larnaca FC (2005–2007), Ermis Aradippou (2010)
Emmanuel Okoye – Aris Limassol FC (2013–2014), Pafos FC (2015–2016)
Kingsley Onuegbu – Nea Salamina (2018–2020)
Benjamin Onwuachi – APOEL FC (2008–2009), AEL Limassol (2011)
Chidi Onyemah – Olympiakos Nicosia (2010–2013), Ethnikos Achna FC (2013–2014), Nea Salamina (2014–2015)
Ifeanyi Onyilo – Ermis Aradippou (2014–2015), Aris Limassol FC (2016)
David Opara – APEP FC (2008–2009)
Waheed Oseni – Apollon Limassol (2008–2012), Ethnikos Achna FC (2012)
Ibrahim Salau – Enosis Neon Paralimni FC (2013)
Monday Shinshima – Enosis Neon Paralimni FC (2013)
Sunny – Pafos FC (2019)
Marco Tagbajumi – Ermis Aradippou (2013–2014), AEL Limassol (2014–2015)
Chigozie Udoji – Enosis Neon Paralimni FC (2018-2021)
Francis Uzoho – Anorthosis Famagusta FC (2019), AC Omonia (2019–2020, 2021-), APOEL FC (2020-2021)

North Macedonia 
Armend Alimi – Nea Salamina (2013), Ermis Aradippou (2013–2014)
Martin Bogatinov – Ermis Aradippou (2014–2015), Ethnikos Achna FC (2015–2018, 2019-)
Mite Cikarski – Ethnikos Achna FC (2016–2018)
Aleksandar Damčevski – Ermis Aradippou (2017–2018)
Vlatko Drobarov – Aris Limassol FC (2017–2018)
Filip Gachevski – Enosis Neon Paralimni FC (2020-2021)
Nikola Gligorov – Alki Larnaca FC (2011–2013)
Ivica Gligorovski – Ethnikos Achna FC (2004–2005)
Darko Glishikj – Doxa Katokopias FC (2021)
Vlatko Grozdanoski – AC Omonia (2004–2007), AEL Limassol (2010)
Boban Grnčarov – APOEL FC (2009–2011)
Ǵorǵi Hristov – Olympiakos Nicosia (2007)
Besart Ibraimi – Enosis Neon Paralimni FC (2014), Ermis Aradippou (2014–2015)
Stojan Ignatov – Ethnikos Achna FC (2010–2012)
Filip Ivanovski – Ethnikos Achna FC (2010–2011)
Igor Jančevski – Enosis Neon Paralimni FC (2006–2008)
Marko Jovanovski – Ethnikos Achna FC (2012–2013)
Hristijan Kirovski – Ethnikos Achna FC (2006), Apollon Limassol (2011–2012)
Jovan Kostovski – Ethnikos Achna FC (2019–2021)
Goran Lazarevski – APOEL FC (2000–2001), AEK Larnaca FC (2004–2005)
Bojan Markovski – Enosis Neon Paralimni FC (2009–2012), Apollon Limassol (2012–2013), Ayia Napa FC (2014–2015), Ethnikos Achna FC (2019–2020)
Kire Markoski – AEL Limassol (2018, 2019-2020)
Petar Miloševski – Enosis Neon Paralimni FC (2005–2012)
Zoran Miserdovski – Apollon Limassol (2001–2003)
Risto Mitrevski – Enosis Neon Paralimni FC (2019)
Daniel Mojsov – AEK Larnaca FC (2016–2021)
Valmir Nafiu – APOEL FC (2015)
Riste Naumov – AC Omonia (2006–2007), Ethnikos Achna FC (2008)
Jane Nikolovski – APOEL FC (2007–2008), AEP Paphos FC (2009–2010)
Edin Nuredinoski – Ethnikos Achna FC (2009–2012), Aris Limassol FC (2015–2016, 2017–2018), Ermis Aradippou (2016–2017)
Kire Ristevski – AEL Limassol (2021-)
Damjan Šiškovski – Doxa Katokopias FC (2020-)
Vanče Šikov – Ethnikos Achna FC (2008–2011)
Ostoja Stjepanović – AEL Limassol (2016)
Milan Stojanovski – APOEL FC (2004–2005)
Filip Timov – Aris Limassol FC (2013–2014)
Aleksandar Todorovski – APOEL FC (2005–2006), Digenis Morphou (2006–2007), AEL Limassol (2007–2008)
Vančo Trajčev – Ethnikos Achna FC (2000–2002, 2004–2005), AEK Larnaca FC (2002–2003)
Dushko Trajchevski – Alki Oroklini (2018–2019), Doxa Katokopias FC (2019-)
Ivan Tričkovski – Enosis Neon Paralimni FC (2009–2010), APOEL FC (2010–2012), AEK Larnaca FC (2016–)
Krste Velkovski – Enosis Neon Paralimni FC (2010)
Davor Zdravkovski – AEL Limassol (2017–)

Northern Ireland 
Tommy Cassidy – APOEL FC (1983–1984)
Kyle Lafferty – Anorthosis Famagusta FC (2021)

Norway 
Haitam Aleesami – Apollon Limassol (2021–)
Fredrik Haugen – AEK Larnaca FC (2021)
Abdisalam Ibrahim – Pafos FC (2019)
Lloyd Lislevand – Anagennisi Dherynia (1997–1998)
Marius Lundemo – APOEL FC (2020–)
John Arne Riise – APOEL FC (2014–2015)
Ghayas Zahid – APOEL FC (2017–2019)

Palestine 
Saado Abdel Salam Fouflia – Ermis Aradippou (2020-2021)

Panama 
Gabriel Gómez – Ermis Aradippou (2010)
Tony Taylor – AC Omonia (2013–2014)

Peru 
Manuel Barreto – APOEL FC (2007)
Francisco Bazán – Anorthosis Famagusta FC (2006–2007), Olympiakos Nicosia (2006)
 Alex Becerra – Olympiakos Nicosia (2005–2006, 2007)
Alfonso Dulanto – APOEL FC (1997–1998, 1999)
Julio García – AEL Limassol (2008), Enosis Neon Paralimni FC (2009)
Gianfranco Labarthe – Apollon Limassol (2012)
Jorge Ramírez – Olympiakos Nicosia (2005–2006)
Hernán Rengifo – AC Omonia (2010–2011)

Poland 
Waldemar Adamczyk – Aris Limassol FC (2005)
Henryk Bałuszyński – Enosis Neon Paralimni FC (2002–2003)
Krzysztof Bukalski – Nea Salamina (2002–2003)
Kacper Chorążka – AC Omonia (2021–)
Radosław Cierzniak – Alki Larnaca FC (2011–2012)
Maciej Czyżniewski – Nea Salamina (2012)
Łukasz Gieresz – Atromitos Yeroskipou (2008–2009)
Łukasz Gikiewicz – AC Omonia (2013–2014), AEL Limassol (2014)
Zbigniew Grzybowski – Olympiakos Nicosia (2007–2008)
Roger Guerreiro – Aris Limassol FC (2015)
Bartlomiej Jamroz – Alki Larnaca FC (2004–2005), APOEL FC  (2005)
Marcin Juszczyk – Nea Salamina (2009)
Radosław Kałużny – AEL Limassol (2006–2007)
Paweł Kapsa – Alki Larnaca FC (2012), Olympiakos Nicosia (2012–2013)
Krzysztof Kłosiński – Nea Salamina (2004–2006)
Ernest Konon – Enosis Neon Paralimni FC (2001–2003)
Kamil Kosowski – APOEL FC (2008–2010), Apollon Limassol (2010–2011)
Rafał Kosznik – AC Omonia (2009)
Wojciech Kowalewski – Anorthosis Famagusta FC (2011)
Wojciech Kowalczyk – Anorthosis Famagusta FC (2001–2003), APOEL FC (2003–2004)
Andrzej Krzyształowicz – APOEL FC (2006)
Jarosław Krzyżanowski – AEL Limassol (2005)
Adam Marciniak – AEK Larnaca FC (2015–2016)
Arkadiusz Malarz – AEL Limassol (2010–2011), Ethnikos Achna FC (2012–2013)
Sławomir Majak – Anorthosis Famagusta FC (2001–2002, 2003–2004)
Stefan Majewski – Apollon Limassol (1988–1989)
Radosław Michalski – Anorthosis Famagusta FC (2001–2004), Apollon Limassol (2005–2007)
Olgierd Moskalewicz – AEL Limassol (2005)
Mariusz Nosal – AEK Larnaca FC (2005)
Emmanuel Olisadebe – APOP Kinyras Peyias FC (2007–2008)
Dariusz Pasieka – Nea Salamina (1993–1995)
Mateusz Piątkowski – APOEL FC (2015–2016)
Arkadiusz Piech – AEL Limassol (2016), Apollon Limassol (2016–2017)
Mariusz Piekarski – Anorthosis Famagusta FC (2002–2003)
Jarosław Popiela – APOEL FC (2006)
Patryk Procek – Ethnikos Achna FC (2016–2018), AEL Limassol (2018-2021), PAEEK FC (2021-)
Eugeniusz Ptak – Apollon Limassol (1989–1992), Nea Salamina  (1992–1993)
Grzegorz Rasiak – AEL Limassol (2010–2011)
Tomasz Sajdak – Alki Larnaca FC (2009)
Maciej Scherfchen – AEP Paphos FC (2010)
Mateusz Szczepaniak – Enosis Neon Paralimni FC (2019–2020)
Pawel Sibik – Apollon Limassol (2002–2003, 2005–2006)
Adrian Sikora – APOEL FC (2009–2011)
Paweł Sobczak – Anorthosis Famagusta FC (2003)
Łukasz Sosin – Apollon Limassol (2002–2007), Anorthosis Famagusta FC (2007–2009), Aris Limassol FC (2011–2012)
Łukasz Skowron – AEL Limassol (2015–2016)
Adam Stachowiak – Anorthosis Famagusta FC (2011–2012)
Mariusz Stępiński – Aris Limassol FC (2021–)
Krzysztof Walczak – Nea Salamina (1992–1994)
Tomasz Welna – Aris Limassol FC (2016–2017)
Mateusz Taudul – AEK Larnaca FC (2015–2016), AEZ Zakakiou (2016–2017)
Bogdan Zając – Nea Salamina (2004–2006)
Maciej Zając – Ayia Napa FC (2012)
Marcin Żewłakow – APOEL FC (2008–2010)
Maciej Żurawski – AC Omonia (2009–2010)

Portugal 
Abel Pereira – Doxa Katokopias FC (2012–2014, 2016)
Alex Soares – AC Omonia (2017–2019)
Alberto Louzeiro – Aris Limassol FC (2012)
Alhandra – Enosis Neon Paralimni FC (2008–2009)
André Geraldes – APOEL FC (2020–2021)
André Queirós – Apollon Limassol (2008)
André Teixeira – AEL Limassol (2017–)
André Vidigal – APOEL FC (2019–2020)
António Semedo – Alki Larnaca FC (2011)
Artur Jorge – APOEL FC (2020–2021)
Barge – Alki Larnaca FC (2012–2013)
Benny – Doxa Katokopias FC (2021–)
Bernardo Vasconcelos – APOP Kinyras Peyias FC (2007, 2008–009), AC Omonia (2008), AEP Paphos FC (2009–2010, 2011), Alki Larnaca FC (2011–2013), Doxa Katokopias FC (2015)
Bruno Aguiar – AC Omonia (2009–2014)
Bruno Pinheiro – Aris Limassol FC (2009–2010)
Bruno Vale – Apollon Limassol (2012–2019)
Cadú – AEL Limassol (2014)
José António Calado – APOP Kinyras Peyias FC (2007–2008), AEP Paphos FC (2008–2009)
Carlos André – Doxa Katokopias FC (2008–2010, 2012–2013), Olympiakos Nicosia (2010–2012)
Carlos Marques – APOP Kinyras Peyias FC (2007–2011), AEL Limassol (2011), Alki Larnaca FC (2011), Olympiakos Nicosia (2012), Doxa Katokopias FC (2012–2014, 2016–2017), Pafos FC (2015–2016)
Carlos Milhazes – Enosis Neon Paralimni FC (2012–2013)
Carlitos – Doxa Katokopias FC (2013–2014, 2015–2016, 2019–2021), AEL Limassol (2014–2015), Anorthosis Famagusta FC (2016–2018)
Castanheira – Doxa Katokopias FC (2012–2013)
China – Ermis Aradippou (2013–2015, 2017–2018), Nea Salamina (2015–2017)
Comboio – Doxa Katokopias FC (2008–2010), Aris Limassol FC (2011–2012)
Cris – AEP Paphos FC (2012–2013)
Cristovão – AEP Paphos FC (2008–2009), Anorthosis Famagusta FC (2009–2012), AC Omonia (2014–2016)
Daniel Carriço – AEL Limassol (2008)
David Caiado – Olympiakos Nicosia (2010–2011)
Davide – Apollon Limassol (2011)
Diogo Luís – Apollon Limassol (2009)
Diogo Ramos – Doxa Katokopias FC (2014–2015)
Diogo Rosado – Ermis Aradippou (2016)
Diogo Vila – AEK Larnaca FC (2011)
Dosa Júnior – Digenis Morphou (2006–2007), AEP Paphos FC (2008–2009), AEL Limassol (2009–2012, 2016–2020)
Duarte Valente – Karmiotissa FC (2021)
Edgar  – Alki Larnaca FC (2008)
Edgar Marcelino – AC Omonia (2006–2008), APOP Kinyras Peyias FC (2009–2010), AEP Paphos FC (2013)
Edú – AEL Limassol (2013–2014)
Élio – Doxa Katokopias FC (2010)
Eugenio Neves – Nea Salamina (2009)
Fabeta – Ayia Napa FC (2012)
Fausto – Ayia Napa FC (2012–2013)
Filipe Azevedo – AEL Limassol (2008)
Filipe da Costa – Enosis Neon Paralimni FC (2012)
Gabi – Nea Salamina (2014)
Gilberto Silva – Ermis Aradippou (2009–2010)
Gilson Costa – Doxa Katokopias FC (2020–2021)
Ginho – Ayia Napa FC (2012–2013)
Gonçalo Abreu – Ermis Aradippou (2013)
Gonçalo Santos – Ethnikos Achna FC (2020-2021)
Gus Ledes – AEK Larnaca FC (2021-)
Hélder Cabral – APOEL FC (2013–2014), AC Omonia (2015–2016)
Hélder Castro – Olympiakos Nicosia (2012–2013, 2017–2018), AEK Larnaca FC (2013–2014)
Hélder Sousa – Olympiakos Nicosia (2010–2012), APOEL FC (2012)
Helio Pinto – Apollon Limassol (2005–2006), APOEL FC (2006–2013)
Hélio Roque – AEL Limassol (2007–2012), Nea Salamina (2011–2014, 2017)
Henrique – Doxa Katokopias FC (2009–2010), AEL Limassol (2011–2012), Olympiakos Nicosia (2012–2013), Ermis Aradippou (2013–2014), Nea Salamina (2014–2015)
Hugo Coelho – Olympiakos Nicosia (2008), AEP Paphos FC (2008–2010)
Hugo Faria – Enosis Neon Paralimni FC (2008–2013)
Hugo Machado – Apollon Limassol (2005–2006), Olympiakos Nicosia (2006–2008), Alki Larnaca FC (2008–2009)
Hugo Costa – Atromitos Yeroskipou (2008)
Hugo Firmino – Doxa Katokopias FC (2020)
Hugo Moutinho – Aris Limassol FC (2013), AEK Kouklia FC (2014)
Hugo Simões – Enosis Neon Paralimni FC (2009)
Hugo Soares – Anagennisi Dherynia (2011–2012), Ayia Napa FC (2012–2013), Ethnikos Achna FC (2013–2014)
Hugo Sousa – AEL Limassol (2012), AEP Paphos FC (2012–2013)
Igor Pita – Doxa Katokopias FC (2010)
Ivo Afonso – Olympiakos Nicosia (2006–2007)
Jaime – Apollon Limassol (2015–2016)
João Alves – AC Omonia (2012–2013)
João Aurélio – Pafos FC (2020-)
João Paiva – Apollon Limassol (2005–2007), AEK Larnaca FC (2008)
João Paulo Andrade – AC Omonia (2012–2014), Apollon Limassol (2014–2015), AEL Limassol (2015–2016)
João Paulo Lopes Caetano – Doxa Katokopias FC (2008), Atromitos Yeroskipou (2008–2009), APEP FC (2009–2010)
João Paulo – Olympiakos Nicosia (2010–2011), Apollon Limassol (2011–2012)
João Pedro – Ethnikos Achna FC (2009–2010)
João Pedro – Apollon Limassol (2015–2021)
Joãozinho – APOEL FC (2019)
Joca – AEL Limassol (2007–2009), Ermis Aradippou (2009–2010)
Joel Pereira – Doxa Katokopias FC (2018-2019), AC Omonia (2019)
Jorge – AEK Kouklia FC (2013–2014), Anagennisi Dherynia (2016–2017)
Jorge Matos – APEP FC (2005–2006)
Jorge Teixeira – Atromitos Yeroskipou (2008), AEP Paphos FC (2009)
José de Sousa – Olympiakos Nicosia – (2008)
José Moreira – AC Omonia – (2013–2015)
Júnior – Doxa Katokopias FC (2007–2008), AEL Limassol (2008–2010), Olympiakos Nicosia (2010–2011)
Kikas – Doxa Katokopias FC (2020-2021)
Kiko – Olympiakos Nicosia – (2019-2020), AC Omonia (2020-)
Leandro Silva – AEL Limassol (2017–2019)
Luís Loureiro – Anorthosis Famagusta FC (2007)
Luís Miguel – APOP Kinyras Peyias FC (2008), Enosis Neon Paralimni FC (2009)
Luís Torres – Doxa Katokopias FC (2009), Ethnikos Achna FC (2009–2011)
Mangualde – Doxa Katokopias FC (2009–2010)
Manú – Ermis Aradippou (2014, 2015)
Sérgio Marakis – Ermis Aradippou (2015)
Márcio Meira – Ermis Aradippou (2020-2021)
Marco Almeida – Nea Salamina (2008)
Marco Bicho – Doxa Katokopias FC (2009–2010)
Marco Paixão – Ethnikos Achna FC (2012–2013)
Margaça – Doxa Katokopias FC (2008–2010), AEK Larnaca FC (2010–2011), AC Omonia (2011–2017)
Mário Carlos – Alki Larnaca FC (2007–2008)
Mário Sérgio – APOEL FC (2012–2016), Apollon Limassol (2017)
Mario Silva – Doxa Katokopias FC (2009)
Marquinhos – Ayia Napa FC (2012)
Medeiros – AC Omonia (2007), APOP Kinyras Peyias FC (2008)
Mickaël Meira – AEL Limassol (2014)
Miguel Ângelo – APOP Kinyras Peyias FC (2010–2011)
Miguel Fidalgo – AEK Larnaca FC (2006–2007)
Miguel Oliveira – Ermis Aradippou (2009–2011)
Miguel Pedro – Anorthosis Famagusta FC (2010), Ermis Aradippou (2010–2011)
Miguel Silva – APOEL FC (2020–2021)
Miguelito – Apollon Limassol (2012–2013)
Miguelito – Olympiakos Nicosia (2017–2018), Ethnikos Achna FC (2019-2021)
Milton – Doxa Katokopias FC (2008–2009)
Monteiro – AEL Limassol (2011–2014), AEK Larnaca FC (2015–2016), Ermis Aradippou (2018)
Nandinho – Alki Larnaca FC (2007–2009)
Nélson – AEK Larnaca FC (2017–2018)
Nuno Assis – AC Omonia (2012–2016)
Nuno Lopes – Apollon Limassol (2015–2016), Aris Limassol FC (2021-)
Nuno Morais – APOEL FC (2007–2019)
Nuno Rodrigues – Doxa Katokopias FC (2007–2010)
Oliveira – Ethnikos Achna FC (2012)
Paiva – Doxa Katokopias FC (2009–2010)
Paulo Adriano – AEK Larnaca FC (2006)
Paulo Alves – Doxa Katokopias FC (2014)
Paulo Costa – Aris Limassol FC (2007), Anorthosis Famagusta FC (2008), APOEL FC (2009), APOP Kinyras Peyias FC (2010), Ermis Aradippou (2010)
Paulo Gomes – Atromitos Yeroskipou (2008–2009)
Paulo Jorge – APOEL FC (2009–2012), Anorthosis Famagusta FC (2012–2014), Doxa Katokopias FC (2014–2015)
Paulo Sereno – Doxa Katokopias FC (2010)
Paulo Sérgio – AEL Limassol (2012–2013)
Paulo Sousa – APOP Kinyras Peyias FC (2007)
Pedro Almeida – Anorthosis Famagusta FC (2012)
Pedro Duarte – Doxa Katokopias FC (2008–2010), Olympiakos Nicosia (2010–2013)
Pedro Lemos – Ermis Aradippou (2020-2021)
Pedro Moita – AEK Larnaca FC (2005–2006)
Pedro Monteiro – Apollon Limassol (2016)
Pedro Moutinho – AEP Paphos FC (2010)
Pedro Pereira – Doxa Katokopias FC (2008), Atromitos Yeroskipou (2008–2009)
Pelé – Anorthosis Famagusta FC (2015–2016)
Rafael Lopes – AC Omonia (2017–2018)
Riera – Ayia Napa FC (2012)
Ricardo Catchana – Ayia Napa FC (2012–2013), Enosis Neon Paralimni FC (2013)
Ricardo Fernandes – APOEL FC (2005–2007), Anorthosis Famagusta FC (2009), AEL Limassol (2010), Doxa Katokopias FC (2012–2014, 2014–2015), AC Omonia (2014)
Ricardo Sousa – AC Omonia (2007)
Romeu Torres – Olympiakos Nicosia (2017–2018)
Rúben Brígido – Ermis Aradippou (2015), Anagennisi Dherynia (2016–2017), Nea Salamina (2017–2018)
Ruca – Alki Oroklini (2018)
Rui Andrade – Doxa Katokopias FC (2008), Atromitos Yeroskipou (2009)
Rui Dolores – Nea Salamina (2007–2008)
Rui Duarte – Anorthosis Famagusta FC (2013)
Rui Figueiredo – APEP FC (2008–2009)
Rui Lima – AC Omonia (2007), Nea Salamina (2008, 2009)
Rui Miguel – AEL Limassol (2012–2013)
Orlando Sá – AEL Limassol (2012–2014)
Saavedra – Doxa Katokopias FC (2008–2011), Ermis Aradippou (2011), Nea Salamina (2012–2013)
Sandro Sakho – Ermis Aradippou (2018)
Santamaria – AEP Paphos FC (2010–2011), Alki Larnaca FC (2011–2013)
Sebastião Nogueira – Nea Salamina (2009), Ermis Aradippou (2010–2011)
Serginho – Ermis Aradippou (2009–2010)
Silas – AEL Limassol (2011–2012), AEP Paphos FC (2012), Ethnikos Achna FC (2013–2014)
Tiago Carneiro – Olympiakos Nicosia (2006–2007), APOP Kinyras Peyias FC (2008)
Tiago Conceição – Doxa Katokopias FC (2012–2013)
Tiago Costa – Olympiakos Nicosia (2012–2013), Doxa Katokopias FC (2013)
Tiago Gomes – APOEL FC (2013–2015), Nea Salamina (2016), Doxa Katokopias FC (2016–2018)
Tiago Gomes – Apollon Limassol (2016–2017)
Tiago Lemos – Nea Salamina (2007–2008)
Tiago Targino – AEL Limassol (2013–2014)
Tiquinho – AEL Limassol (2007–2008), Anorthosis Famagusta FC (2008), AEK Larnaca FC (2008–2009), AEP Paphos FC (2009–2010)
Toni – Ethnikos Achna FC (2008–2009), Apollon Limassol (2009–2013), AEK Larnaca FC (2013–2014), Ermis Aradippou (2015)
Torrão – AC Omonia (2006–2007), Nea Salamina (2008), AEL Limassol (2008–2010)
Vargas – APOP Kinyras Peyias FC (2007–2008), AEL Limassol (2009–2011), Ayia Napa FC (2013)
Vítor Gomes – AC Omonia (2019-2021)
Vítor Lima – Ethnikos Achna FC (2012–2013)
Vítor Afonso – Ayia Napa FC (2012–2013)
Vítor Vinha – Nea Salamina (2009–2010)
Wesllem – AEK Kouklia FC (2013–2014), Anagennisi Dherynia (2016–2017)
Zé Nando – AEK Larnaca FC (2005–2007), AEL Limassol (2007–2008)
Zé Valente – Doxa Katokopias FC (2019-2020)
Zé Vítor – AEL Limassol (2010–2011), Apollon Limassol (2012), Enosis Neon Paralimni FC (2013)

Paraguay 
Aldo Adorno – Enosis Neon Paralimni FC (2006–2007), AEK Larnaca FC (2007–2009), Apollon Limassol (2009–2011), APOEL FC (2011–2014), Ermis Aradippou (2015), Nea Salamina (2015–2016)

Qatar 
Hussein Yasser – AEL Limassol (2004–2005)

Romania 
Dan Alexa – Anorthosis Famagusta FC (2012–2014)
Marius Alexe – Aris Limassol FC (2017)
Bogdan Andone – Apollon Limassol (2003–2008), Alki Larnaca FC (2008)
Ştefan Apostol – Digenis Morphou (2005–2006)
Daniel Bălan – AC Omonia (2006), Alki Larnaca FC (2007–2008), Aris Limassol FC (2009–2010)
Daniel Baston – Evagoras FC (1995)
Paul Batin – Doxa Katokopias FC (2019)
Alexandru Benga – Ermis Aradippou (2016–2017)
Mugur Bolohan – Nea Salamina (2004–2007)
Laurențiu Brănescu – AC Omonia (2015–2016)
Stelian Carabaș – AEL Limassol (2003–2004), Anorthosis Famagusta FC (2005–2007)
Florin Cârstea – Apollon Limassol (1998–1999), Enosis Neon Paralimni FC (1999–2000)
Valentin Cojocaru – Apollon Limassol (2017)
Sebastian Cojocnean – Ethnikos Achna FC (2015–2016)
Alexandru Coman – Ethnikos Achna FC (2015)
Nicolae Constantin – Digenis Morphou (2006–2007)
Ovidiu Dănănae – Apollon Limassol (2013–2014)
Mihai Dina – Aris Limassol FC (2013–2014)
Laurenţiu Diniţă – Aris Limassol FC (2006–2008)
Viorel Domocoş – Digenis Morphou (2005–2006)
Vlad Dragomir – Pafos FC (2021–)
Ion Dudan – Evagoras FC (1995–1996)
Marco Ehmann – Enosis Neon Paralimni (2022–)
Andrei Enescu – Ethnikos Achna FC (2016–2018)
Adrian Falub – Digenis Morphou (2002–2006)
Dragoş Firţulescu – Alki Larnaca FC – (2011)
Daniel Florea – APOEL FC (2006–2009)
George Florescu – AC Omonia (2016–2017)
George Galamaz – Anorthosis Famagusta (2013–2014)
Bogdan Gavrilă – Ethnikos Achna FC (2016–2018)
Ion Geolgău – Aris Limassol (1990–1991)
Răzvan Grădinaru – Karmiotissa (2022–)
Nicolae Grigore – Apollon Limassol (2014)
Ștefan Grigorie – Apollon Limassol (2013)
Adrian Iencsi – Apollon Limassol (2007–2008)
Claudiu Ionescu – Aris Limassol FC (2011–2012)
Alexandru Iacob – Ethnikos Achna FC (2015–2016)
Alexandru Ioniță – AEL Limassol (2014–2015), Aris Limassol FC (2017–2018)
Adrian Iordache – Alki Larnaca FC (2007–2008), AEL Limassol (2008–2009)
Marius Iordache – Ethnikos Achna FC (2005–2007)
Eduard Iordănescu – Alki Larnaca FC – (2001–2002)
Emil Jula – Anorthosis Famagusta FC (2012–2013)
Marian Ivan – Evagoras Paphos (1995–1996)
Ionuţ Luţu – Apollon Limassol (2004)
Tiberiu Lung – Ayia Napa FC (2006–2007)
Florentin Matei – Apollon Limassol (2020–2021)
Dragoş Mihalache – APOP Kinyras Peyias FC (2005)
Adrian Mihalcea – Aris Limassol FC (2006–2008, 2009–2010), AEL Limassol (2008–2009)
Bogdan Mitrea – AEL Limassol (2017–2018), Doxa Katokopias FC (2018–2019)
Mihai Mocanu – AC Omonia (1972–1974)
Costel Mozacu – Aris Limassol FC (2007–2008)
Cristian Munteanu – AEK Larnaca FC (2005)
Eugen Neagoe – Alki Larnaca FC (1995–1996), AC Omonia (1996–1997)
Ionuț Neagu – Nea Salamina (2016–2017)
Marian Neagu – Othellos Athienou F.C. (2014)
Bănel Nicoliță – Aris Limassol FC (2017)
Claudiu Niculescu – AC Omonia (2008)
Emil Ninu – AEK Larnaca FC (2015–2016)
Costel Pantilimon – AC Omonia (2020)
Florin Pârvu – AEL Limassol (2006–2007)
Corneliu Papură – AEL Limassol (2004–2005)
Andrei Patranoiu – Alki Larnaca FC (2013–2014)
Adrian Pigulea – Aris Limassol FC (1992–1993)
Andrei Pițian – Apollon Limassol (2017–2018)
Cornel Predescu – Aris Limassol FC (2016)
Andrei Radu – Aris Limassol FC (2016–2018)
Narcis Răducan – AEK Larnaca FC (2005–2006), AEL Limassol (2006–2007)
Claudiu Răducanu – Nea Salamina (2007)
Mihai Răduț – Aris Limassol FC (2021-)
Cristian Sîrghi – Ermis Aradippou (2016–2017)
Alin Mircea Savu – Digenis Morphou (2004–2005)
Marian Savu – AEL Limassol (2002–2003)
Ion Sburlea – Apollon Limassol (1998)
Tibor Selymes – AEL Limassol (2004–2005)
Gabriel Simion – Aris Limassol FC (2021-)
Ilie Stan – AEL Limassol (1997–1998)
Mihai Stere – Nea Salamina (2004–2006), Aris Limassol (2006–2008)
Valentin Ştefan – AC Omonia (1995–1996)
Pompiliu Stoica – Alki Larnaca FC (2009)
Marius Şumudică – AC Omonia (2003–2004)
Romeo Surdu – Apollon Limassol (2013)
Ciprian Tănasă – Alki Larnaca FC (2012)
Aurel Ţicleanu – Olympiakos Nicosia (1989–1991)
Răzvan Tincu – Doxa Katokopias FC (2018–2019)
Eugen Trică – Anorthosis Famagusta FC (2009)
Cristian Vlad – Ayia Napa FC (2006–2007)
Radu Zaharia – Ermis Aradippou (2017–2018)
Nicolae Zamfir – Alki Larnaca FC (1995–1996)

Russia 
Magomedkhabib Abdusalamov – Pafos FC (2021-)
Andrey Davidovich – Nea Salamina (1993–1994)
Aleksandr Dovbnya – Ethnikos Achna FC (2016–2018), Pafos FC (2018-2019)
Nikita Dubov – Pafos FC (2019–2020)
Aleksandr Filimonov – Nea Salamina (2006–2007)
Pavel Ignatovich – Ermis Aradippou (2017)
Yevgeni Ivanov – Apollon Limassol (2001–2002), Onisilos Sotira (2003–2004)
Nikolai Kipiani – Ethnikos Achna FC (2016–2018), AC Omonia (2018), Ermis Aradippou (2018)
Gennadiy Korkin – Olympiakos Nicosia (1993–1994)
Pavel Lelyukhin – Pafos FC (2018-2021)
Roman Oreshchuk – APOEL FC (1999–2000)
Petr Sasykov – Olympiakos Nicosia (2006–2008)
Aleksandr Shcherbakov – Enosis Neon Paralimni FC (2018-2019)
Dmitri Torbinski – Pafos FC (2018)
Akhrik Tsveiba – AEK Larnaca FC (2001–2002)
Artur Valikaev – Olympiakos Nicosia (2018)
Danila Yanov – Pafos FC (2020-2021)

Rwanda 
Hamad Ndikumana – APOP Kinyras Peyias FC (2005–2006, 2011), Nea Salamina (2006), Anorthosis Famagusta FC (2006–2008), AC Omonia (2008–2009), AEL Limassol (2009–2010)
Louis Aniweta – Doxa Katokopias FC (2007–2008), Alki Larnaca FC (2008–2009), Nea Salamina (2009–2010), APOP Kinyras Peyias FC (2010–2011)
Edwin Ouon – Aris Limassol FC (2008), AEL Limassol (2008–2014), Ermis Aradippou (2014), Apollon Limassol (2015)

São Tomé and Príncipe 
Luís Leal – APOEL FC (2015)

Scotland 
Ian Alexander – Pezoporikos Larnaca (1985–1986)
Mark Burchill – Enosis Neon Paralimni FC (2010–2012)
Mark Fotheringham – Anorthosis Famagusta FC (2010–2011)
David Hannah – AEL Limassol (2002–2003)
Kevin Holt – Pafos FC (2018-2019), Ermis Aradippou (2020–2021)
Iain Jardine – Anorthosis Famagusta FC (1984–1985)
David Kenny – Apollon Limassol (1982–1987, 1991–1993), APOEL FC (1987–1988), APOP Paphos (1990–1991)
Scott McGarvey – Aris Limassol FC (1992–1993)
Jamie McKenzie – Aris Limassol FC (2009)
Ronald McQuilter – APOP Paphos (1992–1993)
Jim McSherry – Pezoporikos Larnaca (1983–1984)
Stuart Millar – Evagoras Paphos (1992–1993)
Alastair Reynolds – Apollon Limassol (2013–2015, 2016–2017), Ayia Napa FC (2015–2016), Nea Salamina (2017–2018, 2019-2020), Karmiotissa FC (2020-2021), AEL Limassol (2021-)
Paul Ritchie  – AC Omonia (2006–2007)

Senegal 
Ismail Ba – AEK Larnaca FC (2005–2006), AC Omonia (2006–2008), AEP Paphos FC (2008–2010)
Alioune Badará – Alki Oroklini (2019)
Mohamed Coly – APOP Kinyras Peyias FC (2010–2011)
Bouna Coundoul – Enosis Neon Paralimni FC (2012–2013), Ethnikos Achna FC (2013–2015)
Ousmane Cissokho – Apollon Limassol (2011–2012)
Modou Diagne – Olympiakos Nicosia (2021–)
Issaga Diallo – Anagennisi Dherynia (2016–2017)
Cheikh Gadiaga – Alki Larnaca FC (2007–2008), AEL Limassol (2008–2009), Ermis Aradippou (2009–2012)
Louis Gomis – Apollon Limassol (2004)
Jackson Mendy – AC Omonia (2015)
Omar Traoré – AEK Larnaca FC (2004–2006)
Ladji Keita – Atromitos Yeroskipou (2008), AEP Paphos FC (2009)
Salif Keita – APEP FC (2009)
Moussa Koita – Olympiakos Nicosia (2011–2012)
Abdoulaye Niang – Ethnikos Achna (2009)
Mame Niang – AEL Limassol (2015)
Bara Mamadou Ndiaye – Doxa Katokopias FC (2016)
Seyni N'Diaye – AEL Limassol (2003–2004, 2007–2008), AC Omonia (2005–2006), Nea Salamina (2006–2007)
Lamine Sakho – Alki Larnaca FC (2008)
Massamba Sambou – AEL Limassol (2015–2016)
Mamadou Kaly Sène – AC Omonia (2020-2021)
Gora Tall – APOP Kinyras Peyias FC (2009–2011), AEP Paphos FC (2012–2013), Ethnikos Achna FC (2013–2015)

Serbia 
Marko Adamović – Karmiotissa FC (2016–2017), AEL Limassol (2018-2021), Doxa Katokopias FC (2021-)
Miloš Adamović – Ethnikos Achna FC (2006–2007), AEK Larnaca FC (2009)
Mirko Aleksić – Ethnikos Achna FC (2004–2005)
Enver Alivodić – Enosis Neon Paralimni FC (2011–2012)
Marko Andić – Anorthosis Famagusta FC (2011–2015), Nea Salamina (2015–2016)
Miloš Antić – Enosis Neon Paralimni FC (2015)
Goran Antonić – Nea Salamina (2016–2017)
Milan Belić – APOP Kinyras Peyias FC (2005–2006), Ethnikos Achna FC (2006–2007, 2009–2010), Anorthosis Famagusta FC (2007–2008), AEP Paphos FC (2008), AEK Larnaca FC (2009), Anagennisi Dherynia (2012)
Aleksandar Čanović – Ermis Aradippou (2010–2011)
Nemanja Čorović – AEL Limassol (2005–2007, 2008), APOEL FC (2007–2008)
Uroš Ćosić – PAEEK FC (2021-)
Slaviša Čula – Enosis Neon Paralimni FC (1998–2000), Olympiakos Nicosia (2000–2001)
Stefan Čupić – Olympiakos Nicosia (2021–)
Milenko Đedović – Olympiakos Nicosia (2001–2003)
Miloš Deletić – Anorthosis Famagusta FC (2021–)
Đorđe Denić – Apollon Limassol (2020-2021)
Petar Đenić – Olympiakos Nicosia (2006–2008), Alki Larnaca FC (2008–2009)
Dušan Đokić – AC Omonia (2009)
Goran Đorđević – AEK Larnaca FC (1999–2000)
Saša Drakulić – AEK Larnaca FC (2004–2005)
Ivan Đurović – APOP Kinyras Peyias FC (2005–2006)
Ivica Francisković – AEK Larnaca FC (2007)
Siniša Gogić – APOEL FC (1989–1992)
Mirza Golubica – Aris Limassol FC (2000–2001)
Goran Grkinić – Ethnikos Achna FC (2006–2008)
Semir Hadžibulić – Doxa Katokopias FC (2013)
Dejan Ilić – AEK Larnaca FC (2008)
Dragan Isailović – AEK Larnaca FC (2003–2005), Ethnikos Achna FC (2006), Alki Larnaca FC (2008)
Milan Jevtović – APOEL FC (2020)
Aleksandar Jovanović  – Apollon Limassol (2020–)
Branislav Jovanović  – Ethnikos Achna FC (2006–2008)
Ivan Jovanović – AEP Paphos FC (2010)
Saša Jovanović – Anorthosis Famagusta FC (1996–1997), AEP Paphos FC (1997–1998), 2002–2005, 2008–2009), AEL Limassol (1998–1999, 2006–2007), APOEL FC (2005–2006)
Siniša Jovanović – Nea Salamina (2000–2001), Ethnikos Assia (2001–2002)
Vukašin Jovanović  – Apollon Limassol (2021–)
Gojko Kacar – Anorthosis Famagusta FC (2018–2019)
Andrija Kaluđerović – AEL Limassol (2014)
Ljubiša Kekić – Alki Larnaca FC (2001–2002), AC Omonia (2002–2003, 2004–2005), Ethnikos Achna FC (2003–2004)
Boban Kitanov – AEL Limassol (1993–1996), AC Omonia (1996–1999), AEK Larnaca FC (2000–2002), Ethnikos Assia (2001), Nea Salamina (2002–2003)
Miloje Kljajević – AEK Larnaca FC (2001–2002)
Aleksandar Kocić – Ethnikos Achna FC (2001–2006)
Miloš Kolaković – Nea Salamina (2007)
Goran Kopunović – AEK Larnaca FC (1996–1997)
Bojan Kovačević – Doxa Katokopias FC (2021–)
Slobodan Krčmarević – Apollon Limassol (1993–1996), Enosis Neon Paralimni FC (1996–1997), Anorthosis Famagusta FC (1997–1998, 2000–2001)
Radovan Krivokapić – Enosis Neon Paralimni FC (2009–2012, 2013)
Miloš Krstić – Nea Salamina (2014)
Radovan Krstović – Enosis Neon Paralimni FC (1995–1996)
Zoran Kuntić – AEK Larnaca FC (1996–1997)
Predrag Lazić – Aris Limassol FC (2011–2012), Ayia Napa FC (2012–2013), Ethnikos Achna FC (2013–2014)
Ognjen Lekić – Aris Limassol FC (2009–2010)
Leo Lerinc – Ethnikos Achna FC (2005–2006)
Dušan Ljubičić – APOEL FC (1994–1995)
Marko Ljubinković – Anorthosis Famagusta FC (2011)
Andrija Majdevac – AEL Limassol (2020–2021, 2021-), Ethnikos Achna FC (2021)
Darko Marić – Anagennisi Dherynia (2003–2004)
Marjan Marković – Alki Larnaca FC (2013)
Saša Marković – Apollon Limassol (2018-)
Saša Marjanović – Nea Salamina (2019-2020)
Zoran Mašić – Apollon Limassol (1999–2000), Ethnikos Achna FC (2000–2001)
Uroš Matić – APOEL FC (2019–2020)
Slobodan Mazić – Digenis Morphou (2004–2005)
Slobodan Medojević – AEL Limassol (2019–)
Nemanja Miletić – Olympiakos Nicosia (2020–2021)
Arsen Mihajlović – Anorthosis Famagusta FC (1996–1997, 2000–2002), APOP Paphos (1997–1998), Ethnikos Assia (1999–2000)
Vesko Mihajlović – APOEL FC (1994), Enosis Neon Paralimni FC (1995), Olympiakos Nicosia (1996), Anorthosis Famagusta FC (1997–1999), AC Omonia (1999–2005)
Nemanja Mijailović – Doxa Katokopias FC (2008)
Dejan Miljković – Alki Larnaca FC (2001–2003)
Mladen Milinkovic – Omonia Aradippou (1993–1994)
Zoran Milinković – Anorthosis Famagusta FC (1999–2001), Doxa Katokopias FC (2001–2002)
Miroslav Milošević – Alki Larnaca FC (2004–2005, 2007)
Zoran Milošević – AEK Larnaca FC (2004)
Ivica Milutinović – Ethnikos Achna FC (2010–2012)
Nenad Mirosavljević – APOEL FC (2008–2011), Olympiakos Nicosia (2011–2012)
Dejan Mitrović – Anorthosis Famagusta FC (2002–2003), Anagennisi Dherynia (2003–2004)
Nebojša Mladenović – APOP Paphos (1996–1997), Apollon Limassol (1997–1999), Doxa Katokopias FC (2000–2001), Ethnikos Assia (2001–2002), Ethnikos Achna FC (2002–2003), Anagennisi Dherynia (2004)
Ivica Momčilović – AEL Limassol (1993–1995)
Miljan Mrdaković – Apollon Limassol (2009–2011), Ethnikos Achna FC (2010), AEK Larnaca FC (2011–2012), Enosis Neon Paralimni FC (2013)
Dragoslav Musić – Ethnikos Achna FC (1992–2002), APOEL FC (2003), AEK Larnaca FC (2003–2004)
Zoran Novaković – Digenis Morphou (2005–2006)
Predrag Ocokoljić – AEL Limassol (2007–2008), Anorthosis Famagusta FC (2008–2010), Ethnikos Achna FC (2010–2011)
Stefan Panić – Pafos FC (2021–)
Radovan Pankov – AEK Larnaca FC (2017–2018)
Aleksandar Pantić – AC Omonia (2008–2009), Alki Larnaca FC (2010–2011)
Aleksandar Pantić – Doxa Katokopias FC (2020), AEL Limassol (2021)
Marko Pavićević – Ethnikos Achna FC (2011)
Andrija Pavlović – APOEL FC (2019–2020)
Miloš Pavlović – Doxa Katokopias FC (2013–2014)
Nino Pekarić – Nea Salamina (2011–2012)
Vladimir Petković – Olympiakos Nicosia (2004–2005)
Goran Petkovski – Olympiakos Nicosia (1998–2000), AEK Larnaca FC (2000–2002), Enosis Neon Paralimni FC (2002–2003), APOEL FC (2003–2004)
Ivan Petrović – Ethnikos Achna FC (2008–2011)
Josip Projić – Ethnikos Achna FC (2020–2021)
Pavle Popara – Enosis Neon Paralimni FC (2007–2008)
Petar Puača – AEK Larnaca FC (2001–2002)
Sava Radosavljev – Olympiakos Nicosia (2001–2002)
Dragan Radosavljević – Aris Limassol FC (2011–2012)
Saša Raca – Ethnikos Achna FC (2003–2004), APOEL FC (2004–2005)
Nenad Rajić – Alki Larnaca FC (2010–2012)
Luka Ratković – Anagennisi Dherynia (2016–2017)
Dejan Rusmir – Olympiakos Nicosia (2012)
Svetozar Šapurić – APOEL FC (1989–1993, 1995–1996), Anorthosis Famagusta FC (1993–1995)
Milan Savić – Anorthosis Famagusta FC (2016), Ethnikos Achna FC (2020–2021)
Vujadin Savić – APOEL FC (2019–)
Marko Šćepović – AC Omonia (2021-)
Slađan Šcepović – Apollon Limassol (1992–1996)
Stefan Šćepović – AC Omonia (2021-)
Milovan Sikimić – Apollon Limassol (2011)
Dragan Simović – Olympiakos Nicosia (2006)
Nebojša Skopljak – Ayia Napa FC (2015–2016), AEZ Zakakiou (2016–2017)
Dalibor Škorić – APOEL FC (2000–2001)
Vuk Sotirović – Nea Salamina (2013)
Slađan Spasić – Olympiakos Nicosia (2007)
Aleksandar Stefanović – Alki Larnaca FC (2004–2005)
Milan Stepanov – AC Omonia (2014)
Zoran Stjepanović – Alki Larnaca FC (2001–2003), AC Omonia (2003–2005), Ethnikos Achna FC (2005–2010)
Uroš Stojanov – Ayia Napa FC (2015)
Luka Stojanović – Apollon Limassol (2014–2016)
Saša Stojanović – Aris Limassol FC (2009–2010), Ethnikos Achna FC (2011–2012)
Milan Svojić – Enosis Neon Paralimni FC (2015–2016)
Vladan Tomić – Aris Limassol FC (1994–1997), Anorthosis Famagusta FC (1997–2000), AEL Limassol (2000–2001) 
Nenad Tomović – AEK Larnaca (2021-)
Nenad Trajković – Alki Larnaca FC (2002–2003)
Božidar Urošević – AEP Paphos FC (2004–2005)
Nebojša Vignjević – Enosis Neon Paralimni FC (1995–1997)
Nebojša Vučićević – Evagoras FC (1993–1994)
Nemanja Vučićević – Anorthosis Famagusta FC (2011–2012)
Ljubiša Vukelja – Ethnikos Achna FC (2007)
Dragan Žarković – Ermis Aradippou (2013–2015), Nea Salamina (2015–2016)
Zlatko Zečević – APOP Kinyras Peyias FC (2010–2011)

Sierra Leone 
Moustapha Bangura – Nea Salamina (2006–2008), AC Omonia (2008), AEP Paphos FC (2009), Apollon Limassol (2009–2012), AEK Larnaca FC (2012–2013), Aris Limassol FC (2015)
Shaka Bangura – Anagennisi Dherynia (2012)
Julius Conteh – Nea Salamina (2006)
Jamil Kargbo – Nea Salamina (2005–2006)
Brima Koroma – Anagennisi Dherynia (2011)
Osman Koroma – Aris Limassol FC (2021–)
Paul Kpaka – Enosis Neon Paralimni FC (2010)
Sahr Lahai – Ethnikos Achna FC (2008–2010)
Sheriff Suma – Ermis Aradippou (2009)
Julius Wobay – Onisilos Sotira (2003–2004), Nea Salamina (2004–2006), Aris Limassol FC (2010)

Slovakia 
Pavol Bajza – Olympiakos Nicosia (2019-2020)
Balázs Borbély – AEL Limassol (2010)
Mário Breška – Enosis Neon Paralimni FC (2009), APOEL FC (2009–2010)
Kamil Čontofalský – AEL Limassol (2010)
Michal Ďuriš – Anorthosis Famagusta FC (2018–2020), AC Omonia (2020-)
Marek Fabula – ENTHOI Lakatamia FC (2005–2006)
Boris Godál – AEL Limassol (2019-2020)
Vladimir Helbich – AEP Paphos FC (2004–2005)
Peter Hodulík – AEK Larnaca FC (2006–2008)
 Zsolt Hornyák – AEP Paphos FC (2004–2005)
Tomáš Hubočan – AC Omonia (2019–)
Pavel Kamesch – Enosis Neon Paralimni FC (2001–2005)
Marián Kello – Aris Limassol FC (2015)
Maroš Klimpl – Aris Limassol FC (2011–2012)
Adam Kováč – Olympiakos Nicosia (2021-)
Matúš Kozáčik – Anorthosis Famagusta FC (2010–2012)
Jozef Kožlej – Olympiakos Nicosia (2000–2002), AC Omonia (2003–2006), Anorthosis Famagusta FC (2006)
Stefan Kysela – AEK Larnaca FC (1995–1996)
Pavol Masaryk – AEL Limassol (2010)
Róbert Mazáň – AEL Limassol (2021-)
Tibor Micinec – AC Omonia (1989–1991)
Martin Miscik – ENTHOI Lakatamia FC (2005–2006)
Ján Mucha – Atromitos Yeroskipou (2008–2009)
Adam Nemec – Pafos FC (2018–2020)
Tomáš Oravec – Enosis Neon Paralimni FC (2012–2013)
Pavol Penksa – Anagennisi Dherynia (2011–2012)
Andrej Pernecký – AEL Limassol (2010)
Branislav Rzeszoto – APOEL FC (2004–2005)
Ivan Schranz – AEL Limassol (2019)
Miroslav Seman – Nea Salamina (2004–2006)
Simeon Stevica – APOP Kinyras Peyias FC (2005)
Dušan Tittel – AC Omonia (1999–2000)
Ivan Trabalík – Aris Limassol FC (2007–2008)
Martin Urban – Enosis Neon Paralimni FC (2002–2005)
Stanislav Velický – AEP Paphos FC (2010)
Robert Veselovsky – Nea Salamina (2016–2021)

Slovenia 
Milan Anđelković – Ethnikos Achna FC (2014)
Amir Agič – Ethnikos Achna FC (2005–2006)
Kenan Bajrić – Pafos FC (2021–)
Gregor Balažic – Enosis Neon Paralimni FC (2020–2021)
Marko Barun – Apollon Limassol (2004–2009), Ermis Aradippou (2009–2011), Aris Limassol FC (2012)
Vid Belec – APOEL FC (2019–2020)
Roman Bezjak – APOEL FC (2019–2020)
Spasoje Bulajič – AEL Limassol (2005–2007)
Miran Burgič – Ethnikos Achna FC (2014)
Marjan Dominko – AEK Larnaca FC (2003–2004)
Marinko Galič – Apollon Limassol (2004–2005)
Saša Gajser – Olympiakos Nicosia (2002–2003)
Miha Golob – AEL Limassol (2005–2007), Aris Limassol FC (2007–2008)
Dejan Grabič – APOP Kinyras Peyias FC (2009–2010)
Branko Ilič – Anorthosis Famagusta FC (2012–2013)
Patrik Ipavec – Enosis Neon Paralimni FC (2005–2006), Ethnikos Achna FC (2006–2008)
Erik Janža – Pafos FC (2017–2018)
Jernej Javornik – AEL Limassol (2005–2006)
Alfred Jermaniš – APOEL FC (1996–1997)
Amer Jukan – Enosis Neon Paralimni FC (2005–2006)
Bekim Kapič – Enosis Neon Paralimni FC (2005–2009)
Amir Karič – AEL Limassol (2005), Anorthosis Famagusta FC (2006)
Andraž Kirm – AC Omonia (2014–2016)
Marko Kmetec – Ethnikos Achna FC (2004–2007)
Jan Koprivec – Anorthosis Famagusta FC (2015–2017), Pafos FC (2017–2018)
Dejan Krljanović – Enosis Neon Paralimni FC (2012)
Dino Lalić – AEK Larnaca FC (2003–2004)
Mitja Lotrič – Pafos FC (2017)
Anej Lovrečič – Ayia Napa FC (2015)
Bojan Milić – Enosis Neon Paralimni FC (2005–2006)
Dejan Milić – Nea Salamina (2011–2012)
Željko Mitrakovič – Ethnikos Achna FC (2005)
Milan Osterc – AEK Larnaca FC (2005)
Janez Pate – Alki Larnaca FC (1996–1997)
Luka Pavlin – Olympiakos Nicosia (2012)
Miran Pavlin – Olympiakos Nicosia (2003–2004), APOEL FC (2004–2005)
David Poljanec – Karmiotissa FC (2016–2017), Aris Limassol FC  (2017), Nea Salamina (2017–2018)
Denis Popović – Anorthosis Famagusta FC (2021–)
Nejc Potokar – AEL Limassol (2014)
Martin Pregelj – Enosis Neon Paralimni FC (2004–2005)
Marko Pridigar – Ayia Napa FC (2015–2016)
Aleš Puš – Ethnikos Achna FC (2007–2008)
Mladen Rudonja – Apollon Limassol (2004), Anorthosis Famagusta FC (2005)
Enes Rujović – Nea Salamina (2013)
Simon Sešlar – AEL Limassol (2006)
Marko Simeunovič – Olympiakos Nicosia (2002–2005), AEL Limassol (2005–2006)
Mitja Širok – Pafos FC (2018-2020)
Gregor Šmajd – Olympiakos Nicosia (2012)
Luka Štor – Apollon Limassol (2021–)
Andraž Struna – Anorthosis Famagusta FC (2018–2019)
Admir Suhonjić – APOP Kinyras Peyias FC (2005–2006)
Almir Tanjič – Enosis Neon Paralimni FC (2005–2008), AEP Paphos FC (2008–2010)
Nikola Tolimir – Enosis Neon Paralimni FC (2013)
Muamer Vugdalič – AEL Limassol (2005–2006)
Zoran Zeljkovič – APOP Kinyras Peyias FC (2009–2010)
Luka Žinko – APOP Kinyras Peyias FC (2009–2010), Alki Larnaca FC (2011)
Saša Živec – AC Omonia (2018–2019)
Anton Žlogar – Enosis Neon Paralimni FC (2004–2006), Anorthosis Famagusta FC (2006–2008), AC Omonia (2008–2010), Alki Larnaca FC (2010–2011)

South Africa 
Ryan Botha – Enosis Neon Paralimni FC (2007)
Delron Buckley – Anorthosis Famagusta FC (2009–2010)
Roger Da Costa – Aris Limassol FC (2015)
MacDonald Mukansi – Enosis Neon Paralimni FC (2004)
Nasief Morris – Apollon Limassol (2010–2011)
Dino Ndlovu – Anorthosis Famagusta FC (2015–2016)
Ricardo Nunes – Aris Limassol FC (2009)
Ryan Wuest – APEP FC (2005–2006)

Soviet Union 
Oleg Blokhin – Aris Limassol FC (1989–1990)
Vladimir Kosarev – Omonia Aradippou (1991–1992)

Spain 
Acorán – AEK Larnaca FC (2016–)
Alberto Aguilar – Anorthosis Famagusta FC (2016–2017)
Diego Aguirre – Apollon Limassol (2019–2021)
Agus – Nea Salamina (2019)
Víctor Álvarez – Pafos FC (2021-)
Alain Álvarez – Othellos Athienou F.C. (2014–2015), Aris Limassol FC (2016–2017)
Iván Amaya – Apollon Limassol (2012)
Pablo Amo – Olympiakos Nicosia (2011)
Igor Angulo – Enosis Neon Paralimni FC (2013–2014)
Dani Aquino – AEK Larnaca FC (2019)
Rubén Arroyo – Ethnikos Achna FC (2013)
Mikel Arruabarrena – AEL Limassol (2016–2018)
Alfonso Artabe – Ermis Aradippou (2016–2017, 2018), Doxa Katokopias FC (2019-2020)
Jonathan Aspas – AEP Paphos FC (2011), Alki Larnaca FC (2011–2013)
Iñaki Astiz – APOEL FC (2015–2017)
Pedro Baquero – Doxa Katokopias FC (2013–2014)
David Barral – APOEL FC (2017)
Miguel Bedoya – Apollon Limassol (2016–2017)
Dani Benitez – AEL Limassol (2017–2019)
Iván Benítez – Doxa Katokopias FC (2011), Nea Salamina (2011–2013)
Bidari – Ethnikos Achna FC (2013–2014)
Aritz Borda – APOEL FC (2012–2014)
Francisco Borrego – Doxa Katokopias FC (2010–2011)
Iago Bouzón – AC Omonia (2010–2012)
Eneko Bóveda – Olympiakos Nicosia (2021-)
Álvaro Brachi – Anorthosis Famagusta FC (2010–2011)
Braulio – Doxa Katokopias FC (2017)
David Cabarcos – Alki Larnaca FC (2007)
Nacho Cases – AEK Larnaca FC (2017–2020)
Airam Cabrera – Anorthosis Famagusta FC (2016–2017)
Iñigo Calderón – Anorthosis Famagusta FC (2016–2017)
Javi Cantero – Enosis Neon Paralimni FC (2013–2014)
Toni Calvo – Anorthosis Famagusta FC (2012–2016)
David Català – AEK Larnaca FC (2012–2019)
José Catalá – Apollon Limassol (2013)
Chando – AEK Larnaca FC (2013)
Jordi Codina – APOEL FC (2015), Pafos FC (2016)
Simón Colina – Nea Salamina (2015–2016)
Adrián Colunga – Anorthosis Famagusta FC (2016–2017)
Biel Company – Pafos FC (2017–2018)
Ferran Corominas – Doxa Katokopias FC (2017)
Carles Coto – Anorthosis Famagusta FC (2010–2011), Doxa Katokopias FC (2016), Ermis Aradippou (2017)
Deivid Rodríguez – Nea Salamina (2020)
Didac Devesa – Ermis Aradippou (2018–2019)
Toni Dovale – Nea Salamina (2018)
Alain Eizmendi – AEL Limassol (2017)
Borja Ekiza – AC Omonia (2017–2018), Enosis Neon Paralimni FC (2018)
Juanan Entrena – AC Omonia (2018–2019)
Ion Erice – Apollon Limassol (2010–2012)
Miguel Escalona – AEK Larnaca FC (2014)
Víctor Espasandín – AC Omonia (2010–2011)
Javier Espinosa – AEK Larnaca FC (2021–)
José Manuel Fernández – AEK Larnaca FC (2020–2021)
Igor Gabilondo – AEK Larnaca FC (2012)
Jose Pedrosa Galan – Aris Limassol FC (2015)
Aritz López Garai – Doxa Katokopias FC (2015)
Ángel García – AEK Larnaca FC (2021–)
Gonzalo García – AEK Larnaca FC (2011–2012), Anorthosis Famagusta FC (2013–2015)
Joaquín García – Ethnikos Achna FC (2015)
Jonan García – Othellos Athienou F.C. (2015)
Manu García – Aris Limassol FC (2021-)
Nando García – AEK Larnaca FC (2020–2021)
Javier Garrido – AEK Larnaca FC (2016–2017)
Manolo Gaspar – Olympiakos Nicosia (2013)
Jon Gaztañaga – AEL Limassol (2018-2020)
Román Golobart – Nea Salamina (2018-2019), AEK Larnaca FC (2020), Doxa Katokopias FC (2021)    
Jordi Gómez – AC Omonia (2018–)
Abraham González – AEK Larnaca FC (2020–)
Fran González – Ermis Aradippou (2015–2016)
Mikel González – AEK Larnaca FC (2018–)
Marcos Gullón – Apollon Limassol (2013–2016)
Chus Herrero – Anorthosis Famagusta FC (2016–2017)
Cristian Hidalgo – Alki Larnaca FC (2012)
José Higón – Doxa Katokopias FC (2014)
José – AC Omonia (2013–2014)
Rubén Jurado – AEL Limassol (2018-2020)
Roberto Lago – APOEL FC (2016–2018)
Jorge Larena – AEK Larnaca FC (2014–2019)
Arnal Llibert – AEK Larnaca FC (2010), Doxa Katokopias FC (2011), Alki Larnaca FC (2011–2012), Ethnikos Achna FC (2013)
Diego León – Nea Salamina (2011–2012, 2013–2015), Doxa Katokopias FC (2016)
Dani López – Doxa Katokopias FC (2013–2016)
Hugo López – Enosis Neon Paralimni FC (2013), Apollon Limassol (2014–2015)
Isma López – AC Omonia (2018)
Jordi López – Nea Salamina (2019–2020)
Alberto Lora – AC Omonia (2018–2019)
Iván Malón – Ermis Aradippou (2018–2019)
Christian Manrique – AC Omonia (2018–2020), Olympiakos Nicosia (2020-)
Albert Marrama – Nea Salamina (2011)
Miguel Massana – AEK Larnaca FC (2014–2015)
Héctor Martínez – AEK Larnaca FC (2020–2021)
Mario Martínez – Olympiakos Nicosia (2012)
Rubén Martínez – AEK Larnaca FC (2021–)
Biel Medina – Anorthosis Famagusta FC (2010)
Tomás Mejías – AC Omonia (2018–2019)
Rubén Miño – AEK Larnaca FC (2016–2017)
Cris Montes – AC Omonia (2018–2019), Nea Salamina (2020–2021)
Ferrán Monzó – Doxa Katokopias FC (2014–2015)
Luis Morán – AEK Larnaca FC (2012), Ermis Aradippou (2013–2015)
José Naranjo – AEK Larnaca FC (2020-2021)
Dennis Nieblas – Othellos Athienou F.C. (2014)
Antonio Núñez – Apollon Limassol (2009–2012)
Álvaro Ocaña – Doxa Katokopias FC (2014–2015)
Edu Oriol – AEL Limassol (2014)
Andrea Orlandi – Anorthosis Famagusta FC (2015–2016), APOEL FC (2016)
Dani Pacheco – Aris Limassol FC (2021-)
Juanma Ortiz – AEK Larnaca FC (2014–2017)
Juan Pablo – AEK Larnaca FC (2017–2018)
Miguel Palanca – Anorthosis Famagusta FC (2017–2018)
Pedrito – Doxa Katokopias FC (2013–2014), Nea Salamina (2014–2016)
Nauzet Pérez – APOEL FC (2017–2018)
Fran Piera – Doxa Katokopias FC (2013–2014)
Juan Pedro Pina – Doxa Katokopias FC (2013)
Ángel Pindado – Nea Salamina (2012)
Gorka Pintado – AEK Larnaca FC (2011–2014)
Piti – AEL Limassol (2017)
Carles Planas – AEK Larnaca FC (2019-2021)
Jorge Prado – APEP FC (2008–2010)
Rubén Rayos – Anorthosis Famagusta FC (2016–2020)
Manuel Redondo – Doxa Katokopias FC (2015–2018)
Manolo Reina – AEP Paphos FC (2012–2013)
Sito Riera – Enosis Neon Paralimni FC (2018-2020), AEL Limassol (2020-)
José Antonio Ríos – Anorthosis Famagusta FC (2016)
Roberto – Apollon Limassol (2012–2014), AC Omonia (2014–2015)
Rodri – Doxa Katokopias FC (2013–2014), AC Omonia (2014–2015)
Joan Román – AEL Limassol (2018)
Rubén Palazuelos – Ermis Aradippou (2014)
Cristian Portilla – Ermis Aradippou (2015)
Pulpo Romero – AEK Larnaca FC (2012–2013), AEL Limassol (2013–2015)
Álex Rubio – AC Omonia (2014–2015)
Jesús Rueda – APOEL FC (2017–2019)
José Manuel Rueda – AC Omonia (2010–2011)
Raúl Ruiz – AEK Larnaca FC (2019-2020)
Mikel Saizar – AEK Larnaca FC (2015–2016)
Emilio Sánchez – Doxa Katokopias FC (2017)
Adrián Sardinero – AEL Limassol (2014–2016), Apollon Limassol (2016–2020)
Albert Serrán – AEK Larnaca FC (2011–2013, 2015–2016), Anorthosis Famagusta FC (2014–2015), Doxa Katokopias FC (2016–2017)
Lluís Sastre – AEK Larnaca FC (2019–2020)
Antonio Soldevilla – Apollon Limassol (2006–2007)
Carles Soria – AEK Larnaca FC (2017–2018)
David Sousa – Nea Salamina (2012–2013)
Pablo Suárez – Doxa Katokopias FC (2012–2014)
Tete – AEK Larnaca FC (2015–2021)
Joan Tomás – AEK Larnaca FC (2013–2019)
Toni – Doxa Katokopias FC (2014)
Toñito – AEK Larnaca FC (2009)
Toño – AEK Larnaca FC (2014–2016, 2018-2021)
Manuel Torres – AEL Limassol (2018-)
Dani Tortolero – Doxa Katokopias FC (2014)
Jorge Troiteiro – Doxa Katokopias FC (2012–2013)
Joan Truyols – AEK Larnaca FC (2016–2021)
José Antonio Villanueva – Ethnikos Achna FC (2010)
Carmelo Yuste – APOP Kinyras Peyias FC (2010–2011)
Héctor Yuste – Apollon Limassol (2017–2021), AC Omonia (2021-)

Suriname 
Diego Biseswar – Apollon Limassol (2021)

Sweden 
John Alvbåge – AC Omonia (2018), Nea Salamina (2018–2019)
Junes Barny – Enosis Neon Paralimni FC (2021)
Nahir Besara – Pafos FC (2019-2020)
Björn Morgan Enqvist – Nea Salamina (2006–2007), APEP FC (2008–2009)
Joakim Hallenberg – Enosis Neon Paralimni FC (2000–2001)
Linus Hallenius – APOEL FC (2019-2020)
Markus Holgersson – Anorthosis Famagusta FC (2014–2016)
Valentino Lai – Apollon Limassol (2010)
Daniel Larsson – Apollon Limassol (2020-2021)
Caspar Pauckstadt – Enosis Neon Paralimni FC (1987–1988)
Dejan Pavlović – Anorthosis Famagusta FC (2000–2001)
Fredrik Risp – Ethnikos Achna FC (2012–2013)
Maic Sema – AEL Limassol (2015)
Rasmus Sjöstedt – Aris Limassol FC (2017)
Håkan Svensson – Enosis Neon Paralimni FC (2004–2005)
Jörgen Wålemark – Enosis Neon Paralimni FC (2000–2001), AEL Limassol (2001–2003)
Christer Youssef – Aris Limassol FC (2014, 2016–2018)

Switzerland 
Admir Bilibani – Nea Salamina (2007)
Oliver Buff – Anorthosis Famagusta FC (2019)
Clirim Kryeziu – APEP FC (2009–2010)
Slaviša Dugić – Aris Limassol FC (2009–2010), Ethnikos Achna FC (2010–2011)
Innocent Emeghara – Ermis Aradippou (2017–2018)
Mickaël Facchinetti – APOEL FC (2019)
Johnny Leoni – AC Omonia (2012–2013)
Joël Mall – Pafos FC (2018–2019), Apollon Limassol (2019-2020), AEK Larnaca FC (2021),  Olympiakos Nicosia (2021-)
Dragan Mihajlović – APOEL FC (2019-2020)
Vero Salatić – AC Omonia (2011–2012)
Hélios Sessolo – Ethnikos Achna FC (2021)
Gezim Shalaj – Enosis Neon Paralimni FC (2016)
Henri Siqueira – Enosis Neon Paralimni FC (2007–2008)
Fabian Stoller – Ethnikos Achna FC (2014–2015)
Kiliann Witschi – APEP FC (2009–2010)

Togo 
Jean-Paul Abalo – APOEL FC (2006)
Jonathan Ayité – Olympiakos Nicosia (2019–2020)
Hugues Ayivi – Pafos FC (2015–2016)
Guillaume Brenner – Alki Larnaca FC (2010–2011)
Henri Eninful – Doxa Katokopias FC (2015–2018)
Serge Gakpé – Apollon Limassol (2019–2021)

Trinidad and Tobago 
Daniel Carr – Apollon Limassol (2019)
Nickel Orr – PAEEK FC (2021-)
Ryan Telfer – Nea Salamina (2020)

Tunisia 
Selim Benachour – APOEL FC (2012–2014)
Tijani Belaid – APOEL FC (2011)
Salema Kasdaoui – APEP FC (2008–2009)
Sami Gtari – APEP FC (2008–2009)
Ismail Sassi – Othellos Athienou F.C. (2014–2015), AEZ Zakakiou (2016), AEL Limassol (2017–2018), Karmiotissa FC (2020-2021), Doxa Katokopias FC (2021-)
Mohamed Sassi – Othellos Athienou F.C. (2014), Karmiotissa FC (2020-2021)

Ukraine 
Maksym Borovets – Enosis Neon Paralimni FC (2013)
Vitalii Doroshenko – Doxa Katokopias FC (2013–2014)
Artem Filimonov – Pafos FC (2017)
Maksym Ilchysh – AEL Limassol (2013)
Maksym Imerekov – Ermis Aradippou (2017–2018)
Vitaliy Ivanko – AEK Larnaca FC (2013–2014)
Ihor Khudobyak – Ethnikos Achna FC (2019–)
Bohdan Kovalenko – Pafos FC (2017)
Orest Kuzyk – Pafos FC (2020-2021)
Vitaliy Kvashuk – Aris Limassol FC (2021-)
Hennadiy Lytovchenko – AEL Limassol (1995)
Illya Markovskyy – Ethnikos Achna FC (2019–2020), Enosis Neon Paralimni FC (2020–2021)
Yaroslav Martynyuk – Ermis Aradippou (2016–2019)
Dmytro Mykhaylenko – APOP Kinyras Peyias FC (2007–2009)
Andriy Novak – Ermis Aradippou (2017)
Yevhen Pavlov – Doxa Katokopias FC (2018–2019)
Artur Rudko – Pafos FC (2019-)
Yevhen Selin – Anorthosis Famagusta FC (2019-2021)
Yuriy Yakovenko – Anorthosis Famagusta FC (2014–2015)

United States 
Louis Bennett – Anorthosis Famagusta FC (2016)
Mix Diskerud – AC Omonia (2021-)
Riley Grant – Enosis Neon Paralimni FC (2018)
Mukwelle Akale – Pafos FC (2020-2021)
Danny Williams – Pafos FC (2019-2020)

Uruguay 
Michel Acosta – AEK Kouklia FC (2013–2014)
Edgardo Adinolfi – Olympiakos Nicosia (2006–2007)
Juan Ángel Albín – AC Omonia (2018)
Diego Barboza – Enosis Neon Paralimni FC (2020-2021)
Pablo Cáceres – AC Omonia (2009)
Agustín Cedrés – Apollon Limassol (2017–2018)
Fabrizio Cetraro – Alki Larnaca FC (2009)
Fernando Fadeuille – Apollon Limassol (2004–2005)
Damián Frascarelli – APOP Kinyras Peyias FC (2010–2011), AC Omonia (2011)
Carlos García – Alki Larnaca FC (2008, 2009), APEP FC (2009–2010), Nea Salamina (2011–2012)
Rodrigo Gómez – Ermis Aradippou (2011)
Christian Latorre – Ermis Aradippou (2015–2016)
Matías Pérez – AC Omonia (2015)
Bruno Piano – APEP FC (2008–2009)
Diego Poyet – Pafos FC (2017–2018)
Nicolás Raimondi – Ermis Aradippou (2009)
Ignacio Risso – Apollon Limassol (2007–2009)
Julio Rodríguez – Alki Larnaca FC (2008)
Omar Santana – Olympiakos Nicosia (2020-2021)
Diego Silva – AEK Kouklia FC (2013)
David Texeira – AEL Limassol (2018)
Joaquín Varela – Pafos FC (2019-2020)
Nico Varela – Enosis Neon Paralimni FC (2019-2020), Nea Salamina (2020–2021), PAEEK FC (2021-)

Venezuela 
Rafael Acosta – Alki Oroklini (2018–2019), Olympiakos Nicosia (2019-2020)
Rubén Arocha – Karmiotissa FC (2016–2017)
Homero Calderón – Doxa Katokopias FC (2014–2015)
César Castro – Olympiakos Nicosia (2011)
Jonathan España – AEL Limassol (2014–2015)
Jaime Moreno – AEL Limassol (2014)
Fernando de Ornelas – Olympiakos Nicosia (2004–2005)
Frank Feltscher – AEL Limassol (2015–2016)
Héctor González – AEK Larnaca FC (2007–2009), Alki Larnaca FC (2010–2011), Ermis Aradippou  (2011), Doxa Katokopias FC (2014–2015)
Raúl González – Doxa Katokopias FC (2007–2008, 2014–2015), Enosis Neon Paralimni FC (2008–2010), Apollon Limassol (2010–2011), Anagennisi Dherynia (2011)
Leopoldo Jiménez – Aris Limassol FC (2007)
Miku – AC Omonia (2019–2020)
Christian Novoa – Doxa Katokopias FC (2014–2015)
Rafael Ponzo – Nea Salamina (2010), Ermis Aradippou (2010)
Rafael Quiñónes – Alki Oroklini (2017–2019)
José Manuel Rey – AEK Larnaca FC (2007–2008)
Elias Romero – Doxa Katokopias FC (2014–2015)
José Romo – Karmiotissa FC (2020–2021), AEK Larnaca FC (2021-)
Rafael Romo – AEL Limassol (2016–2017), APOEL FC (2018-2019)
Andrés Rouga – Alki Larnaca FC (2007–2009), AEL Limassol (2009–2010)
Roberto Rosales – AEK Larnaca FC (2021-)
Jeffrén Suárez – AEK Larnaca FC (2019)
Luis Vallenilla – Nea Salamina (2007–2008)

Wales 
 Jack Evans – Pafos FC (2020)

Yugoslavia 
Suad Beširević – Apollon Limassol (1990–1992), APEP FC (1993–1994), Aris Limassol FC (1994–1995), Omonia Aradippou (1995–1996)
Vojislav Budimirović – Apollon Limassol (1996–1998)
Dragiša Binić – APOEL FC (1993–1994)
Milenko Kovačević – AEK Larnaca FC (1995–1997), Nea Salamina (1997–1998)

Zambia 
Prosper Chiluya – Pafos FC (2017)
Edward Kangwa – Olympiakos Nicosia (2005)
William Njovu – Enosis Neon Paralimni FC (2013–2014)
Moses Sichone – AEP Paphos FC (2009–2010)
Justine Zulu – Enosis Neon Paralimni FC (2012)
January Zyambo – Olympiakos Nicosia (2005)

Zimbabwe 
Shingayi Kaondera – AEP Paphos FC (2002–2005), AEK Larnaca FC (2007), Nea Salamina (2008)
Noel Kaseke – Enosis Neon Paralimni FC (2004–2007), AC Omonia (2007–2012), Alki Larnaca FC (2012)
David Kutyauripo – APOP Kinyras Peyias FC (2005–2006)
Edward Mashinya – Ethnikos Achna FC (2012–2013), Ermis Aradippou (2016–2017)
Musawengosi Mguni – AC Omonia (2004–2008), Ayia Napa FC (2015)
Thabani Moyo – Olympiakos Nicosia (2005–2006), Doxa Katokopias FC (2010), Anagennisi Dherynia (2011)
Zenzo Moyo – AEP Paphos FC (2000–2004), Olympiakos Nicosia (2004)
Kennedy Nagoli – Enosis Neon Paralimni FC (2002–2004), AEK Larnaca FC (2004–2006)
Joel Lupahla – AEP Paphos FC (2000–2004)
Agent Sawu – APOP Paphos (1991–1992)
Obadiah Tarumbwa – Enosis Neon Paralimni FC (2009–2011)

References 

Cyprus
 
Association football player non-biographical articles